

433001–433100 

|-bgcolor=#d6d6d6
| 433001 ||  || — || June 15, 2010 || WISE || WISE || — || align=right | 4.2 km || 
|-id=002 bgcolor=#E9E9E9
| 433002 ||  || — || September 19, 2003 || Kitt Peak || Spacewatch || — || align=right | 2.1 km || 
|-id=003 bgcolor=#d6d6d6
| 433003 ||  || — || May 13, 2010 || Mount Lemmon || Mount Lemmon Survey || — || align=right | 3.5 km || 
|-id=004 bgcolor=#E9E9E9
| 433004 ||  || — || July 19, 2012 || Siding Spring || SSS || — || align=right | 1.7 km || 
|-id=005 bgcolor=#d6d6d6
| 433005 ||  || — || April 30, 2011 || Mount Lemmon || Mount Lemmon Survey || — || align=right | 2.4 km || 
|-id=006 bgcolor=#fefefe
| 433006 ||  || — || January 27, 2007 || Kitt Peak || Spacewatch || MAS || align=right data-sort-value="0.89" | 890 m || 
|-id=007 bgcolor=#d6d6d6
| 433007 ||  || — || May 28, 2011 || Mount Lemmon || Mount Lemmon Survey || THB || align=right | 3.8 km || 
|-id=008 bgcolor=#d6d6d6
| 433008 ||  || — || October 14, 2007 || Mount Lemmon || Mount Lemmon Survey || BRA || align=right | 1.7 km || 
|-id=009 bgcolor=#d6d6d6
| 433009 ||  || — || January 20, 2009 || Mount Lemmon || Mount Lemmon Survey || — || align=right | 3.0 km || 
|-id=010 bgcolor=#fefefe
| 433010 ||  || — || August 19, 2008 || Siding Spring || SSS || — || align=right data-sort-value="0.93" | 930 m || 
|-id=011 bgcolor=#d6d6d6
| 433011 ||  || — || March 18, 2010 || Kitt Peak || Spacewatch || — || align=right | 6.3 km || 
|-id=012 bgcolor=#fefefe
| 433012 ||  || — || August 23, 2008 || Siding Spring || SSS || — || align=right data-sort-value="0.95" | 950 m || 
|-id=013 bgcolor=#d6d6d6
| 433013 ||  || — || March 11, 2005 || Mount Lemmon || Mount Lemmon Survey || EOS || align=right | 1.8 km || 
|-id=014 bgcolor=#E9E9E9
| 433014 ||  || — || October 29, 2003 || Kitt Peak || Spacewatch ||  || align=right | 2.3 km || 
|-id=015 bgcolor=#fefefe
| 433015 ||  || — || November 1, 2005 || Mount Lemmon || Mount Lemmon Survey || — || align=right | 1.0 km || 
|-id=016 bgcolor=#E9E9E9
| 433016 ||  || — || June 4, 2003 || Kitt Peak || Spacewatch || — || align=right | 1.7 km || 
|-id=017 bgcolor=#fefefe
| 433017 ||  || — || November 20, 2009 || Kitt Peak || Spacewatch || — || align=right data-sort-value="0.88" | 880 m || 
|-id=018 bgcolor=#FA8072
| 433018 ||  || — || April 20, 2004 || Kitt Peak || Spacewatch || — || align=right data-sort-value="0.77" | 770 m || 
|-id=019 bgcolor=#d6d6d6
| 433019 ||  || — || November 11, 2006 || Kitt Peak || Spacewatch || VER || align=right | 2.9 km || 
|-id=020 bgcolor=#d6d6d6
| 433020 ||  || — || March 18, 2010 || Mount Lemmon || Mount Lemmon Survey || EOS || align=right | 1.9 km || 
|-id=021 bgcolor=#d6d6d6
| 433021 ||  || — || October 4, 2006 || Mount Lemmon || Mount Lemmon Survey || (260)7:4 || align=right | 3.3 km || 
|-id=022 bgcolor=#E9E9E9
| 433022 ||  || — || November 4, 2004 || Kitt Peak || Spacewatch || — || align=right data-sort-value="0.98" | 980 m || 
|-id=023 bgcolor=#E9E9E9
| 433023 ||  || — || November 24, 2003 || Anderson Mesa || LONEOS || — || align=right | 2.1 km || 
|-id=024 bgcolor=#E9E9E9
| 433024 ||  || — || April 20, 2007 || Kitt Peak || Spacewatch || — || align=right | 1.0 km || 
|-id=025 bgcolor=#d6d6d6
| 433025 ||  || — || September 19, 2006 || Catalina || CSS || — || align=right | 3.4 km || 
|-id=026 bgcolor=#d6d6d6
| 433026 ||  || — || March 10, 2010 || XuYi || PMO NEO || — || align=right | 5.6 km || 
|-id=027 bgcolor=#E9E9E9
| 433027 ||  || — || September 14, 2012 || Catalina || CSS || EUN || align=right | 1.5 km || 
|-id=028 bgcolor=#fefefe
| 433028 ||  || — || May 26, 2000 || Kitt Peak || Spacewatch || MAS || align=right data-sort-value="0.87" | 870 m || 
|-id=029 bgcolor=#E9E9E9
| 433029 ||  || — || November 8, 2008 || Kitt Peak || Spacewatch || — || align=right | 1.5 km || 
|-id=030 bgcolor=#E9E9E9
| 433030 ||  || — || September 16, 2003 || Kitt Peak || Spacewatch || NEM || align=right | 2.2 km || 
|-id=031 bgcolor=#E9E9E9
| 433031 ||  || — || May 22, 2003 || Kitt Peak || Spacewatch || — || align=right data-sort-value="0.83" | 830 m || 
|-id=032 bgcolor=#E9E9E9
| 433032 ||  || — || March 11, 2005 || Mount Lemmon || Mount Lemmon Survey || AGN || align=right | 1.2 km || 
|-id=033 bgcolor=#d6d6d6
| 433033 ||  || — || October 2, 1995 || Kitt Peak || Spacewatch || — || align=right | 3.0 km || 
|-id=034 bgcolor=#d6d6d6
| 433034 ||  || — || October 19, 2007 || Kitt Peak || Spacewatch || — || align=right | 2.4 km || 
|-id=035 bgcolor=#E9E9E9
| 433035 ||  || — || October 9, 2008 || Kitt Peak || Spacewatch || — || align=right data-sort-value="0.91" | 910 m || 
|-id=036 bgcolor=#d6d6d6
| 433036 ||  || — || October 10, 2007 || Mount Lemmon || Mount Lemmon Survey || — || align=right | 4.4 km || 
|-id=037 bgcolor=#E9E9E9
| 433037 ||  || — || April 13, 2011 || Mount Lemmon || Mount Lemmon Survey || — || align=right | 1.4 km || 
|-id=038 bgcolor=#E9E9E9
| 433038 ||  || — || September 23, 2008 || Mount Lemmon || Mount Lemmon Survey || — || align=right | 1.5 km || 
|-id=039 bgcolor=#d6d6d6
| 433039 ||  || — || September 12, 2006 || Catalina || CSS || — || align=right | 4.0 km || 
|-id=040 bgcolor=#E9E9E9
| 433040 ||  || — || September 28, 2003 || Anderson Mesa || LONEOS || — || align=right | 2.6 km || 
|-id=041 bgcolor=#d6d6d6
| 433041 ||  || — || September 13, 2007 || Mount Lemmon || Mount Lemmon Survey || — || align=right | 2.3 km || 
|-id=042 bgcolor=#E9E9E9
| 433042 ||  || — || June 8, 2007 || Kitt Peak || Spacewatch || — || align=right | 1.3 km || 
|-id=043 bgcolor=#E9E9E9
| 433043 ||  || — || November 7, 2008 || Mount Lemmon || Mount Lemmon Survey || — || align=right | 1.8 km || 
|-id=044 bgcolor=#d6d6d6
| 433044 ||  || — || September 11, 2007 || Mount Lemmon || Mount Lemmon Survey || — || align=right | 2.4 km || 
|-id=045 bgcolor=#E9E9E9
| 433045 ||  || — || September 18, 2003 || Kitt Peak || Spacewatch || — || align=right | 2.3 km || 
|-id=046 bgcolor=#d6d6d6
| 433046 ||  || — || September 14, 2012 || Catalina || CSS || EOS || align=right | 1.8 km || 
|-id=047 bgcolor=#E9E9E9
| 433047 ||  || — || May 15, 2007 || Mount Lemmon || Mount Lemmon Survey || EUN || align=right | 1.2 km || 
|-id=048 bgcolor=#E9E9E9
| 433048 ||  || — || May 5, 2006 || Mount Lemmon || Mount Lemmon Survey || — || align=right | 2.0 km || 
|-id=049 bgcolor=#d6d6d6
| 433049 ||  || — || February 13, 2010 || Mount Lemmon || Mount Lemmon Survey || — || align=right | 3.5 km || 
|-id=050 bgcolor=#d6d6d6
| 433050 ||  || — || October 11, 2001 || Kitt Peak || Spacewatch || EOS || align=right | 1.9 km || 
|-id=051 bgcolor=#d6d6d6
| 433051 ||  || — || March 23, 2004 || Kitt Peak || Spacewatch || — || align=right | 3.4 km || 
|-id=052 bgcolor=#E9E9E9
| 433052 ||  || — || March 2, 2006 || Mount Lemmon || Mount Lemmon Survey || — || align=right | 1.5 km || 
|-id=053 bgcolor=#d6d6d6
| 433053 ||  || — || September 12, 2007 || Mount Lemmon || Mount Lemmon Survey || — || align=right | 2.3 km || 
|-id=054 bgcolor=#E9E9E9
| 433054 ||  || — || November 6, 2008 || Kitt Peak || Spacewatch || — || align=right | 2.2 km || 
|-id=055 bgcolor=#d6d6d6
| 433055 ||  || — || August 14, 2006 || Siding Spring || SSS || LIX || align=right | 3.8 km || 
|-id=056 bgcolor=#d6d6d6
| 433056 ||  || — || October 10, 2007 || Mount Lemmon || Mount Lemmon Survey || EOS || align=right | 1.8 km || 
|-id=057 bgcolor=#fefefe
| 433057 ||  || — || October 28, 2005 || Catalina || CSS || NYS || align=right data-sort-value="0.71" | 710 m || 
|-id=058 bgcolor=#d6d6d6
| 433058 ||  || — || October 23, 1995 || Kitt Peak || Spacewatch || — || align=right | 2.9 km || 
|-id=059 bgcolor=#d6d6d6
| 433059 ||  || — || October 10, 1996 || Kitt Peak || Spacewatch || EOS || align=right | 1.9 km || 
|-id=060 bgcolor=#d6d6d6
| 433060 ||  || — || October 5, 2012 || Mount Lemmon || Mount Lemmon Survey || — || align=right | 2.6 km || 
|-id=061 bgcolor=#E9E9E9
| 433061 ||  || — || March 23, 2006 || Kitt Peak || Spacewatch || — || align=right | 1.6 km || 
|-id=062 bgcolor=#E9E9E9
| 433062 ||  || — || September 9, 2008 || Mount Lemmon || Mount Lemmon Survey || EUN || align=right | 1.3 km || 
|-id=063 bgcolor=#d6d6d6
| 433063 ||  || — || February 2, 2009 || Kitt Peak || Spacewatch || — || align=right | 2.7 km || 
|-id=064 bgcolor=#d6d6d6
| 433064 ||  || — || May 9, 2010 || Mount Lemmon || Mount Lemmon Survey ||  || align=right | 2.6 km || 
|-id=065 bgcolor=#d6d6d6
| 433065 ||  || — || October 8, 2012 || Mount Lemmon || Mount Lemmon Survey || — || align=right | 2.4 km || 
|-id=066 bgcolor=#d6d6d6
| 433066 ||  || — || January 31, 2009 || Mount Lemmon || Mount Lemmon Survey || — || align=right | 2.8 km || 
|-id=067 bgcolor=#d6d6d6
| 433067 ||  || — || April 10, 2010 || Mount Lemmon || Mount Lemmon Survey || — || align=right | 2.9 km || 
|-id=068 bgcolor=#d6d6d6
| 433068 ||  || — || September 14, 2007 || Mount Lemmon || Mount Lemmon Survey || EOS || align=right | 1.6 km || 
|-id=069 bgcolor=#d6d6d6
| 433069 ||  || — || October 20, 2007 || Mount Lemmon || Mount Lemmon Survey || — || align=right | 2.6 km || 
|-id=070 bgcolor=#d6d6d6
| 433070 ||  || — || November 18, 2007 || Mount Lemmon || Mount Lemmon Survey || — || align=right | 4.5 km || 
|-id=071 bgcolor=#E9E9E9
| 433071 ||  || — || September 24, 2008 || Kitt Peak || Spacewatch || — || align=right | 1.5 km || 
|-id=072 bgcolor=#d6d6d6
| 433072 ||  || — || March 8, 2005 || Mount Lemmon || Mount Lemmon Survey || — || align=right | 2.2 km || 
|-id=073 bgcolor=#d6d6d6
| 433073 ||  || — || September 24, 1995 || Kitt Peak || Spacewatch || — || align=right | 2.5 km || 
|-id=074 bgcolor=#d6d6d6
| 433074 ||  || — || April 29, 2011 || Mount Lemmon || Mount Lemmon Survey || — || align=right | 2.9 km || 
|-id=075 bgcolor=#d6d6d6
| 433075 ||  || — || October 16, 2007 || Mount Lemmon || Mount Lemmon Survey || — || align=right | 2.8 km || 
|-id=076 bgcolor=#d6d6d6
| 433076 ||  || — || November 1, 2007 || Kitt Peak || Spacewatch || — || align=right | 2.9 km || 
|-id=077 bgcolor=#d6d6d6
| 433077 ||  || — || April 10, 2010 || Mount Lemmon || Mount Lemmon Survey || EOS || align=right | 2.0 km || 
|-id=078 bgcolor=#d6d6d6
| 433078 ||  || — || February 18, 2010 || Kitt Peak || Spacewatch || KOR || align=right | 1.6 km || 
|-id=079 bgcolor=#d6d6d6
| 433079 ||  || — || October 19, 2006 || Kitt Peak || Spacewatch || — || align=right | 3.5 km || 
|-id=080 bgcolor=#d6d6d6
| 433080 ||  || — || October 16, 2007 || Kitt Peak || Spacewatch || EOS || align=right | 2.2 km || 
|-id=081 bgcolor=#d6d6d6
| 433081 ||  || — || January 28, 2004 || Kitt Peak || Spacewatch || — || align=right | 2.7 km || 
|-id=082 bgcolor=#d6d6d6
| 433082 ||  || — || October 20, 2007 || Mount Lemmon || Mount Lemmon Survey || — || align=right | 2.8 km || 
|-id=083 bgcolor=#E9E9E9
| 433083 ||  || — || March 7, 2011 || Siding Spring || SSS || — || align=right | 1.5 km || 
|-id=084 bgcolor=#d6d6d6
| 433084 ||  || — || October 21, 2006 || Kitt Peak || Spacewatch || — || align=right | 3.8 km || 
|-id=085 bgcolor=#E9E9E9
| 433085 ||  || — || April 12, 2002 || Socorro || LINEAR || — || align=right | 1.8 km || 
|-id=086 bgcolor=#d6d6d6
| 433086 ||  || — || January 18, 2009 || Kitt Peak || Spacewatch || — || align=right | 2.8 km || 
|-id=087 bgcolor=#d6d6d6
| 433087 ||  || — || September 26, 1995 || Kitt Peak || Spacewatch || — || align=right | 2.6 km || 
|-id=088 bgcolor=#d6d6d6
| 433088 ||  || — || April 16, 2004 || Kitt Peak || Spacewatch || VER || align=right | 2.6 km || 
|-id=089 bgcolor=#d6d6d6
| 433089 ||  || — || November 9, 2007 || Kitt Peak || Spacewatch || EMA || align=right | 3.4 km || 
|-id=090 bgcolor=#d6d6d6
| 433090 ||  || — || January 31, 2009 || Mount Lemmon || Mount Lemmon Survey || — || align=right | 2.9 km || 
|-id=091 bgcolor=#E9E9E9
| 433091 ||  || — || September 22, 2008 || Mount Lemmon || Mount Lemmon Survey || — || align=right data-sort-value="0.93" | 930 m || 
|-id=092 bgcolor=#d6d6d6
| 433092 ||  || — || April 2, 2005 || Mount Lemmon || Mount Lemmon Survey || — || align=right | 2.3 km || 
|-id=093 bgcolor=#E9E9E9
| 433093 ||  || — || September 19, 2007 || Kitt Peak || Spacewatch || AGN || align=right | 1.4 km || 
|-id=094 bgcolor=#d6d6d6
| 433094 ||  || — || October 8, 2007 || Mount Lemmon || Mount Lemmon Survey || EOS || align=right | 1.8 km || 
|-id=095 bgcolor=#E9E9E9
| 433095 ||  || — || September 22, 2008 || Kitt Peak || Spacewatch || — || align=right | 1.0 km || 
|-id=096 bgcolor=#E9E9E9
| 433096 ||  || — || March 11, 2005 || Mount Lemmon || Mount Lemmon Survey || — || align=right | 2.3 km || 
|-id=097 bgcolor=#d6d6d6
| 433097 ||  || — || August 27, 2006 || Kitt Peak || Spacewatch || — || align=right | 3.0 km || 
|-id=098 bgcolor=#d6d6d6
| 433098 ||  || — || October 8, 2012 || Kitt Peak || Spacewatch || — || align=right | 3.8 km || 
|-id=099 bgcolor=#d6d6d6
| 433099 ||  || — || April 7, 2005 || Kitt Peak || Spacewatch || EOS || align=right | 1.7 km || 
|-id=100 bgcolor=#E9E9E9
| 433100 ||  || — || September 19, 1995 || Kitt Peak || Spacewatch || — || align=right | 2.2 km || 
|}

433101–433200 

|-bgcolor=#d6d6d6
| 433101 ||  || — || March 16, 2004 || Kitt Peak || Spacewatch || — || align=right | 2.7 km || 
|-id=102 bgcolor=#d6d6d6
| 433102 ||  || — || August 29, 2006 || Kitt Peak || Spacewatch || — || align=right | 3.0 km || 
|-id=103 bgcolor=#d6d6d6
| 433103 ||  || — || October 11, 1996 || Kitt Peak || Spacewatch || EOS || align=right | 1.6 km || 
|-id=104 bgcolor=#d6d6d6
| 433104 ||  || — || January 16, 2009 || Kitt Peak || Spacewatch || VER || align=right | 2.7 km || 
|-id=105 bgcolor=#d6d6d6
| 433105 ||  || — || January 20, 2009 || Kitt Peak || Spacewatch || — || align=right | 2.7 km || 
|-id=106 bgcolor=#d6d6d6
| 433106 ||  || — || April 8, 2010 || Catalina || CSS || — || align=right | 3.4 km || 
|-id=107 bgcolor=#E9E9E9
| 433107 ||  || — || September 28, 2008 || Mount Lemmon || Mount Lemmon Survey || — || align=right | 1.5 km || 
|-id=108 bgcolor=#d6d6d6
| 433108 ||  || — || July 11, 2005 || Kitt Peak || Spacewatch || — || align=right | 3.8 km || 
|-id=109 bgcolor=#E9E9E9
| 433109 ||  || — || October 20, 2003 || Kitt Peak || Spacewatch || AGN || align=right | 1.4 km || 
|-id=110 bgcolor=#E9E9E9
| 433110 ||  || — || April 30, 2011 || Mount Lemmon || Mount Lemmon Survey || ADE || align=right | 2.5 km || 
|-id=111 bgcolor=#d6d6d6
| 433111 ||  || — || September 12, 2001 || Socorro || LINEAR || — || align=right | 3.3 km || 
|-id=112 bgcolor=#d6d6d6
| 433112 ||  || — || September 25, 2007 || Mount Lemmon || Mount Lemmon Survey || EOS || align=right | 1.8 km || 
|-id=113 bgcolor=#E9E9E9
| 433113 ||  || — || December 30, 2005 || Kitt Peak || Spacewatch || RAF || align=right | 2.9 km || 
|-id=114 bgcolor=#d6d6d6
| 433114 ||  || — || September 24, 2012 || Kitt Peak || Spacewatch || — || align=right | 2.9 km || 
|-id=115 bgcolor=#E9E9E9
| 433115 ||  || — || April 20, 2007 || Mount Lemmon || Mount Lemmon Survey || — || align=right | 1.1 km || 
|-id=116 bgcolor=#E9E9E9
| 433116 ||  || — || October 16, 2003 || Kitt Peak || Spacewatch || — || align=right | 2.5 km || 
|-id=117 bgcolor=#E9E9E9
| 433117 ||  || — || February 24, 2006 || Kitt Peak || Spacewatch || — || align=right | 1.5 km || 
|-id=118 bgcolor=#d6d6d6
| 433118 ||  || — || April 4, 2005 || Mount Lemmon || Mount Lemmon Survey || — || align=right | 2.3 km || 
|-id=119 bgcolor=#d6d6d6
| 433119 ||  || — || September 30, 2006 || Mount Lemmon || Mount Lemmon Survey || — || align=right | 2.6 km || 
|-id=120 bgcolor=#E9E9E9
| 433120 ||  || — || April 2, 2006 || Kitt Peak || Spacewatch || — || align=right | 2.2 km || 
|-id=121 bgcolor=#d6d6d6
| 433121 ||  || — || October 18, 2007 || Mount Lemmon || Mount Lemmon Survey || — || align=right | 3.5 km || 
|-id=122 bgcolor=#E9E9E9
| 433122 ||  || — || March 25, 2006 || Kitt Peak || Spacewatch || — || align=right | 2.3 km || 
|-id=123 bgcolor=#E9E9E9
| 433123 ||  || — || October 2, 1999 || Kitt Peak || Spacewatch || — || align=right | 1.8 km || 
|-id=124 bgcolor=#d6d6d6
| 433124 ||  || — || May 7, 2000 || Kitt Peak || Spacewatch || — || align=right | 2.5 km || 
|-id=125 bgcolor=#d6d6d6
| 433125 ||  || — || September 10, 2007 || Mount Lemmon || Mount Lemmon Survey || — || align=right | 2.7 km || 
|-id=126 bgcolor=#E9E9E9
| 433126 ||  || — || September 22, 2008 || Kitt Peak || Spacewatch || — || align=right | 1.2 km || 
|-id=127 bgcolor=#E9E9E9
| 433127 ||  || — || May 13, 2007 || Mount Lemmon || Mount Lemmon Survey || — || align=right | 1.2 km || 
|-id=128 bgcolor=#d6d6d6
| 433128 ||  || — || August 18, 2006 || Kitt Peak || Spacewatch || VER || align=right | 2.2 km || 
|-id=129 bgcolor=#d6d6d6
| 433129 ||  || — || September 11, 2007 || Mount Lemmon || Mount Lemmon Survey || — || align=right | 2.4 km || 
|-id=130 bgcolor=#E9E9E9
| 433130 ||  || — || June 10, 2007 || Siding Spring || SSS || — || align=right | 2.4 km || 
|-id=131 bgcolor=#E9E9E9
| 433131 ||  || — || March 4, 2006 || Kitt Peak || Spacewatch || — || align=right | 1.4 km || 
|-id=132 bgcolor=#d6d6d6
| 433132 ||  || — || December 6, 2005 || Kitt Peak || Spacewatch || (6124)3:2 || align=right | 3.7 km || 
|-id=133 bgcolor=#E9E9E9
| 433133 ||  || — || September 18, 1995 || Kitt Peak || Spacewatch || (5) || align=right data-sort-value="0.80" | 800 m || 
|-id=134 bgcolor=#d6d6d6
| 433134 ||  || — || November 20, 2001 || Socorro || LINEAR || — || align=right | 3.5 km || 
|-id=135 bgcolor=#d6d6d6
| 433135 ||  || — || September 10, 2007 || Kitt Peak || Spacewatch || — || align=right | 2.2 km || 
|-id=136 bgcolor=#d6d6d6
| 433136 ||  || — || August 29, 2006 || Kitt Peak || Spacewatch || — || align=right | 3.1 km || 
|-id=137 bgcolor=#E9E9E9
| 433137 ||  || — || March 16, 2007 || Kitt Peak || Spacewatch || — || align=right data-sort-value="0.90" | 900 m || 
|-id=138 bgcolor=#d6d6d6
| 433138 ||  || — || October 9, 2007 || Kitt Peak || Spacewatch || — || align=right | 2.5 km || 
|-id=139 bgcolor=#d6d6d6
| 433139 ||  || — || August 29, 2006 || Kitt Peak || Spacewatch || — || align=right | 2.8 km || 
|-id=140 bgcolor=#d6d6d6
| 433140 ||  || — || September 20, 1995 || Kitt Peak || Spacewatch || — || align=right | 2.8 km || 
|-id=141 bgcolor=#E9E9E9
| 433141 ||  || — || February 1, 2006 || Kitt Peak || Spacewatch || MIS || align=right | 2.5 km || 
|-id=142 bgcolor=#d6d6d6
| 433142 ||  || — || September 14, 2007 || Mount Lemmon || Mount Lemmon Survey || — || align=right | 2.6 km || 
|-id=143 bgcolor=#d6d6d6
| 433143 ||  || — || February 8, 2010 || WISE || WISE || — || align=right | 3.7 km || 
|-id=144 bgcolor=#d6d6d6
| 433144 ||  || — || September 26, 2006 || Catalina || CSS || — || align=right | 4.0 km || 
|-id=145 bgcolor=#d6d6d6
| 433145 ||  || — || March 16, 2004 || Campo Imperatore || CINEOS || — || align=right | 3.0 km || 
|-id=146 bgcolor=#E9E9E9
| 433146 ||  || — || January 16, 2005 || Kitt Peak || Spacewatch || — || align=right | 2.8 km || 
|-id=147 bgcolor=#d6d6d6
| 433147 ||  || — || March 2, 2009 || Mount Lemmon || Mount Lemmon Survey || — || align=right | 3.3 km || 
|-id=148 bgcolor=#d6d6d6
| 433148 ||  || — || March 17, 2010 || Kitt Peak || Spacewatch || — || align=right | 3.0 km || 
|-id=149 bgcolor=#d6d6d6
| 433149 ||  || — || May 13, 2004 || Kitt Peak || Spacewatch || — || align=right | 3.5 km || 
|-id=150 bgcolor=#d6d6d6
| 433150 ||  || — || December 30, 2007 || Mount Lemmon || Mount Lemmon Survey || — || align=right | 2.9 km || 
|-id=151 bgcolor=#d6d6d6
| 433151 ||  || — || May 3, 2005 || Kitt Peak || Spacewatch || — || align=right | 3.5 km || 
|-id=152 bgcolor=#E9E9E9
| 433152 ||  || — || September 19, 2007 || Kitt Peak || Spacewatch || — || align=right | 1.8 km || 
|-id=153 bgcolor=#E9E9E9
| 433153 ||  || — || October 5, 2003 || Kitt Peak || Spacewatch || NEM || align=right | 2.1 km || 
|-id=154 bgcolor=#d6d6d6
| 433154 ||  || — || November 3, 2007 || Kitt Peak || Spacewatch || — || align=right | 2.2 km || 
|-id=155 bgcolor=#E9E9E9
| 433155 ||  || — || December 2, 2008 || Kitt Peak || Spacewatch || — || align=right | 3.3 km || 
|-id=156 bgcolor=#E9E9E9
| 433156 ||  || — || October 26, 2008 || Mount Lemmon || Mount Lemmon Survey || — || align=right | 1.7 km || 
|-id=157 bgcolor=#E9E9E9
| 433157 ||  || — || February 20, 2006 || Kitt Peak || Spacewatch || — || align=right | 1.6 km || 
|-id=158 bgcolor=#d6d6d6
| 433158 ||  || — || September 28, 2006 || Kitt Peak || Spacewatch || — || align=right | 3.4 km || 
|-id=159 bgcolor=#E9E9E9
| 433159 ||  || — || September 4, 2008 || Kitt Peak || Spacewatch || — || align=right | 2.2 km || 
|-id=160 bgcolor=#d6d6d6
| 433160 ||  || — || September 11, 2007 || Kitt Peak || Spacewatch || KOR || align=right | 1.5 km || 
|-id=161 bgcolor=#E9E9E9
| 433161 ||  || — || March 13, 2007 || Mount Lemmon || Mount Lemmon Survey || — || align=right | 1.0 km || 
|-id=162 bgcolor=#d6d6d6
| 433162 ||  || — || October 12, 2004 || Kitt Peak || Spacewatch || 3:2 || align=right | 3.0 km || 
|-id=163 bgcolor=#d6d6d6
| 433163 ||  || — || September 10, 2007 || Kitt Peak || Spacewatch || — || align=right | 2.2 km || 
|-id=164 bgcolor=#E9E9E9
| 433164 ||  || — || September 4, 2007 || Mount Lemmon || Mount Lemmon Survey || — || align=right | 1.9 km || 
|-id=165 bgcolor=#E9E9E9
| 433165 ||  || — || May 6, 2006 || Mount Lemmon || Mount Lemmon Survey || — || align=right | 2.5 km || 
|-id=166 bgcolor=#d6d6d6
| 433166 ||  || — || October 7, 2007 || Kitt Peak || Spacewatch || — || align=right | 2.4 km || 
|-id=167 bgcolor=#d6d6d6
| 433167 ||  || — || May 11, 2010 || Mount Lemmon || Mount Lemmon Survey || — || align=right | 3.4 km || 
|-id=168 bgcolor=#E9E9E9
| 433168 ||  || — || October 21, 2008 || Kitt Peak || Spacewatch || EUN || align=right | 1.3 km || 
|-id=169 bgcolor=#d6d6d6
| 433169 ||  || — || August 27, 2006 || Kitt Peak || Spacewatch || — || align=right | 2.9 km || 
|-id=170 bgcolor=#d6d6d6
| 433170 ||  || — || January 31, 2009 || Mount Lemmon || Mount Lemmon Survey || EOS || align=right | 1.8 km || 
|-id=171 bgcolor=#d6d6d6
| 433171 ||  || — || October 15, 2012 || Mount Lemmon || Mount Lemmon Survey || — || align=right | 3.0 km || 
|-id=172 bgcolor=#d6d6d6
| 433172 ||  || — || October 16, 2007 || Catalina || CSS || — || align=right | 3.1 km || 
|-id=173 bgcolor=#E9E9E9
| 433173 ||  || — || October 17, 2003 || Kitt Peak || Spacewatch || — || align=right | 2.8 km || 
|-id=174 bgcolor=#d6d6d6
| 433174 ||  || — || May 19, 2005 || Mount Lemmon || Mount Lemmon Survey || EOS || align=right | 2.2 km || 
|-id=175 bgcolor=#d6d6d6
| 433175 ||  || — || May 9, 2005 || Kitt Peak || Spacewatch || — || align=right | 2.8 km || 
|-id=176 bgcolor=#E9E9E9
| 433176 ||  || — || March 16, 2007 || Mount Lemmon || Mount Lemmon Survey || — || align=right | 1.7 km || 
|-id=177 bgcolor=#E9E9E9
| 433177 ||  || — || March 4, 2011 || Mount Lemmon || Mount Lemmon Survey || — || align=right | 1.7 km || 
|-id=178 bgcolor=#d6d6d6
| 433178 ||  || — || January 12, 2010 || WISE || WISE || — || align=right | 4.0 km || 
|-id=179 bgcolor=#d6d6d6
| 433179 ||  || — || October 15, 2007 || Mount Lemmon || Mount Lemmon Survey || — || align=right | 3.0 km || 
|-id=180 bgcolor=#E9E9E9
| 433180 ||  || — || July 30, 2008 || Mount Lemmon || Mount Lemmon Survey || — || align=right | 1.3 km || 
|-id=181 bgcolor=#E9E9E9
| 433181 ||  || — || May 10, 2003 || Kitt Peak || Spacewatch || — || align=right | 1.2 km || 
|-id=182 bgcolor=#E9E9E9
| 433182 ||  || — || October 13, 2004 || Socorro || LINEAR || — || align=right | 1.6 km || 
|-id=183 bgcolor=#E9E9E9
| 433183 ||  || — || January 13, 2005 || Kitt Peak || Spacewatch || — || align=right | 1.9 km || 
|-id=184 bgcolor=#d6d6d6
| 433184 ||  || — || September 17, 2012 || Kitt Peak || Spacewatch || 3:2 || align=right | 3.5 km || 
|-id=185 bgcolor=#d6d6d6
| 433185 ||  || — || February 14, 2009 || Mount Lemmon || Mount Lemmon Survey || EOS || align=right | 2.0 km || 
|-id=186 bgcolor=#E9E9E9
| 433186 ||  || — || March 12, 2007 || Kitt Peak || Spacewatch || KON || align=right | 2.1 km || 
|-id=187 bgcolor=#E9E9E9
| 433187 ||  || — || March 23, 2006 || Kitt Peak || Spacewatch || — || align=right | 3.6 km || 
|-id=188 bgcolor=#d6d6d6
| 433188 ||  || — || September 23, 2012 || Kitt Peak || Spacewatch || — || align=right | 2.7 km || 
|-id=189 bgcolor=#d6d6d6
| 433189 ||  || — || October 16, 2001 || Kitt Peak || Spacewatch || — || align=right | 2.6 km || 
|-id=190 bgcolor=#d6d6d6
| 433190 ||  || — || May 13, 2010 || Mount Lemmon || Mount Lemmon Survey || — || align=right | 3.1 km || 
|-id=191 bgcolor=#E9E9E9
| 433191 ||  || — || October 1, 2008 || Mount Lemmon || Mount Lemmon Survey || — || align=right | 1.1 km || 
|-id=192 bgcolor=#d6d6d6
| 433192 ||  || — || December 31, 2008 || Kitt Peak || Spacewatch || EOS || align=right | 1.8 km || 
|-id=193 bgcolor=#d6d6d6
| 433193 ||  || — || November 19, 2007 || Mount Lemmon || Mount Lemmon Survey || — || align=right | 2.9 km || 
|-id=194 bgcolor=#d6d6d6
| 433194 ||  || — || May 9, 2010 || Mount Lemmon || Mount Lemmon Survey || — || align=right | 3.7 km || 
|-id=195 bgcolor=#d6d6d6
| 433195 ||  || — || January 18, 2010 || WISE || WISE || — || align=right | 3.9 km || 
|-id=196 bgcolor=#d6d6d6
| 433196 ||  || — || October 9, 2007 || Mount Lemmon || Mount Lemmon Survey || — || align=right | 2.9 km || 
|-id=197 bgcolor=#d6d6d6
| 433197 ||  || — || May 19, 2010 || Mount Lemmon || Mount Lemmon Survey || — || align=right | 3.1 km || 
|-id=198 bgcolor=#E9E9E9
| 433198 ||  || — || October 28, 2008 || Kitt Peak || Spacewatch || — || align=right | 1.8 km || 
|-id=199 bgcolor=#d6d6d6
| 433199 ||  || — || September 12, 2006 || Catalina || CSS || — || align=right | 3.7 km || 
|-id=200 bgcolor=#E9E9E9
| 433200 ||  || — || March 21, 2010 || Mount Lemmon || Mount Lemmon Survey || — || align=right | 2.8 km || 
|}

433201–433300 

|-bgcolor=#E9E9E9
| 433201 ||  || — || October 5, 2003 || Kitt Peak || Spacewatch || — || align=right | 3.8 km || 
|-id=202 bgcolor=#d6d6d6
| 433202 ||  || — || November 16, 2006 || Kitt Peak || Spacewatch || 7:4 || align=right | 4.0 km || 
|-id=203 bgcolor=#d6d6d6
| 433203 ||  || — || May 4, 2005 || Kitt Peak || Spacewatch || — || align=right | 3.5 km || 
|-id=204 bgcolor=#fefefe
| 433204 ||  || — || October 17, 2001 || Socorro || LINEAR || — || align=right data-sort-value="0.98" | 980 m || 
|-id=205 bgcolor=#E9E9E9
| 433205 ||  || — || September 10, 2007 || Mount Lemmon || Mount Lemmon Survey || — || align=right | 2.0 km || 
|-id=206 bgcolor=#d6d6d6
| 433206 ||  || — || September 14, 2006 || Catalina || CSS || — || align=right | 3.6 km || 
|-id=207 bgcolor=#E9E9E9
| 433207 ||  || — || September 19, 2003 || Kitt Peak || Spacewatch || — || align=right | 2.4 km || 
|-id=208 bgcolor=#E9E9E9
| 433208 ||  || — || September 6, 2008 || Mount Lemmon || Mount Lemmon Survey || — || align=right | 1.1 km || 
|-id=209 bgcolor=#d6d6d6
| 433209 ||  || — || November 18, 2001 || Kitt Peak || Spacewatch || — || align=right | 3.3 km || 
|-id=210 bgcolor=#d6d6d6
| 433210 ||  || — || September 20, 2001 || Socorro || LINEAR || — || align=right | 2.9 km || 
|-id=211 bgcolor=#d6d6d6
| 433211 ||  || — || March 18, 2004 || Kitt Peak || Spacewatch || EOS || align=right | 2.0 km || 
|-id=212 bgcolor=#d6d6d6
| 433212 ||  || — || October 8, 2007 || Kitt Peak || Spacewatch || — || align=right | 2.3 km || 
|-id=213 bgcolor=#E9E9E9
| 433213 ||  || — || October 18, 2003 || Anderson Mesa || LONEOS || — || align=right | 2.9 km || 
|-id=214 bgcolor=#d6d6d6
| 433214 ||  || — || October 10, 2007 || Mount Lemmon || Mount Lemmon Survey || — || align=right | 2.6 km || 
|-id=215 bgcolor=#d6d6d6
| 433215 ||  || — || August 29, 2006 || Kitt Peak || Spacewatch || — || align=right | 2.5 km || 
|-id=216 bgcolor=#E9E9E9
| 433216 ||  || — || October 19, 2003 || Kitt Peak || Spacewatch || EUN || align=right | 1.2 km || 
|-id=217 bgcolor=#d6d6d6
| 433217 ||  || — || October 17, 2012 || Mount Lemmon || Mount Lemmon Survey || EOS || align=right | 1.8 km || 
|-id=218 bgcolor=#E9E9E9
| 433218 ||  || — || November 7, 2008 || Mount Lemmon || Mount Lemmon Survey || — || align=right | 1.2 km || 
|-id=219 bgcolor=#d6d6d6
| 433219 ||  || — || August 27, 2006 || Kitt Peak || Spacewatch || — || align=right | 2.9 km || 
|-id=220 bgcolor=#d6d6d6
| 433220 ||  || — || January 17, 2009 || Kitt Peak || Spacewatch || — || align=right | 2.8 km || 
|-id=221 bgcolor=#d6d6d6
| 433221 ||  || — || December 22, 2008 || Kitt Peak || Spacewatch || EOS || align=right | 3.2 km || 
|-id=222 bgcolor=#E9E9E9
| 433222 ||  || — || September 7, 2008 || Mount Lemmon || Mount Lemmon Survey || — || align=right | 1.9 km || 
|-id=223 bgcolor=#d6d6d6
| 433223 ||  || — || October 19, 1995 || Kitt Peak || Spacewatch || — || align=right | 3.3 km || 
|-id=224 bgcolor=#E9E9E9
| 433224 ||  || — || September 12, 2007 || Mount Lemmon || Mount Lemmon Survey || HOF || align=right | 3.0 km || 
|-id=225 bgcolor=#d6d6d6
| 433225 ||  || — || April 5, 2010 || Kitt Peak || Spacewatch || — || align=right | 2.9 km || 
|-id=226 bgcolor=#d6d6d6
| 433226 ||  || — || October 21, 2012 || Kitt Peak || Spacewatch || — || align=right | 3.4 km || 
|-id=227 bgcolor=#E9E9E9
| 433227 ||  || — || March 2, 2006 || Kitt Peak || Spacewatch || — || align=right | 1.7 km || 
|-id=228 bgcolor=#d6d6d6
| 433228 ||  || — || October 17, 2012 || Mount Lemmon || Mount Lemmon Survey || — || align=right | 3.1 km || 
|-id=229 bgcolor=#d6d6d6
| 433229 ||  || — || October 9, 2007 || Mount Lemmon || Mount Lemmon Survey || KOR || align=right | 1.3 km || 
|-id=230 bgcolor=#E9E9E9
| 433230 ||  || — || May 13, 2011 || Mount Lemmon || Mount Lemmon Survey || — || align=right | 2.2 km || 
|-id=231 bgcolor=#d6d6d6
| 433231 ||  || — || August 29, 2006 || Kitt Peak || Spacewatch || — || align=right | 2.7 km || 
|-id=232 bgcolor=#d6d6d6
| 433232 ||  || — || February 1, 2009 || Kitt Peak || Spacewatch || — || align=right | 2.8 km || 
|-id=233 bgcolor=#E9E9E9
| 433233 ||  || — || August 21, 2007 || Siding Spring || SSS || — || align=right | 3.4 km || 
|-id=234 bgcolor=#d6d6d6
| 433234 ||  || — || October 10, 2007 || Kitt Peak || Spacewatch || — || align=right | 2.3 km || 
|-id=235 bgcolor=#E9E9E9
| 433235 ||  || — || April 7, 2006 || Kitt Peak || Spacewatch || — || align=right | 1.3 km || 
|-id=236 bgcolor=#d6d6d6
| 433236 ||  || — || September 17, 1995 || Kitt Peak || Spacewatch || — || align=right | 2.5 km || 
|-id=237 bgcolor=#E9E9E9
| 433237 ||  || — || October 16, 2012 || Kitt Peak || Spacewatch || — || align=right | 1.6 km || 
|-id=238 bgcolor=#d6d6d6
| 433238 ||  || — || September 16, 2006 || Catalina || CSS || — || align=right | 3.5 km || 
|-id=239 bgcolor=#E9E9E9
| 433239 ||  || — || June 2, 2010 || WISE || WISE || — || align=right | 3.1 km || 
|-id=240 bgcolor=#d6d6d6
| 433240 ||  || — || April 16, 2004 || Kitt Peak || Spacewatch || — || align=right | 3.9 km || 
|-id=241 bgcolor=#d6d6d6
| 433241 ||  || — || October 27, 2006 || Kitt Peak || Spacewatch || 7:4 || align=right | 3.7 km || 
|-id=242 bgcolor=#d6d6d6
| 433242 ||  || — || December 18, 2001 || Socorro || LINEAR || — || align=right | 3.6 km || 
|-id=243 bgcolor=#d6d6d6
| 433243 ||  || — || September 28, 2006 || Catalina || CSS || Tj (2.94) || align=right | 4.9 km || 
|-id=244 bgcolor=#d6d6d6
| 433244 ||  || — || September 26, 2006 || Mount Lemmon || Mount Lemmon Survey || — || align=right | 3.4 km || 
|-id=245 bgcolor=#E9E9E9
| 433245 ||  || — || October 24, 1995 || Kitt Peak || Spacewatch || EUN || align=right | 1.3 km || 
|-id=246 bgcolor=#d6d6d6
| 433246 ||  || — || October 9, 2012 || Mount Lemmon || Mount Lemmon Survey || — || align=right | 2.5 km || 
|-id=247 bgcolor=#d6d6d6
| 433247 ||  || — || November 7, 2007 || Mount Lemmon || Mount Lemmon Survey || EOS || align=right | 2.3 km || 
|-id=248 bgcolor=#E9E9E9
| 433248 ||  || — || November 11, 2004 || Kitt Peak || Spacewatch || (5) || align=right | 1.0 km || 
|-id=249 bgcolor=#d6d6d6
| 433249 ||  || — || August 23, 2001 || Kitt Peak || Spacewatch || — || align=right | 2.5 km || 
|-id=250 bgcolor=#d6d6d6
| 433250 ||  || — || March 3, 2009 || Kitt Peak || Spacewatch || — || align=right | 3.0 km || 
|-id=251 bgcolor=#d6d6d6
| 433251 ||  || — || May 19, 2010 || Mount Lemmon || Mount Lemmon Survey || — || align=right | 4.0 km || 
|-id=252 bgcolor=#d6d6d6
| 433252 ||  || — || March 18, 2009 || Kitt Peak || Spacewatch || — || align=right | 3.0 km || 
|-id=253 bgcolor=#E9E9E9
| 433253 ||  || — || May 8, 2006 || Kitt Peak || Spacewatch || — || align=right | 2.6 km || 
|-id=254 bgcolor=#d6d6d6
| 433254 ||  || — || October 3, 2006 || Mount Lemmon || Mount Lemmon Survey || — || align=right | 3.0 km || 
|-id=255 bgcolor=#d6d6d6
| 433255 ||  || — || November 17, 2007 || Kitt Peak || Spacewatch || — || align=right | 3.0 km || 
|-id=256 bgcolor=#d6d6d6
| 433256 ||  || — || March 3, 2009 || Mount Lemmon || Mount Lemmon Survey || — || align=right | 4.0 km || 
|-id=257 bgcolor=#E9E9E9
| 433257 ||  || — || September 8, 1999 || Catalina || CSS || (5) || align=right | 1.0 km || 
|-id=258 bgcolor=#d6d6d6
| 433258 ||  || — || January 1, 2008 || Mount Lemmon || Mount Lemmon Survey || — || align=right | 3.1 km || 
|-id=259 bgcolor=#d6d6d6
| 433259 ||  || — || September 25, 2006 || Catalina || CSS || — || align=right | 3.7 km || 
|-id=260 bgcolor=#E9E9E9
| 433260 ||  || — || July 10, 2007 || Siding Spring || SSS || EUN || align=right | 1.3 km || 
|-id=261 bgcolor=#d6d6d6
| 433261 ||  || — || July 25, 1995 || Kitt Peak || Spacewatch || — || align=right | 2.6 km || 
|-id=262 bgcolor=#d6d6d6
| 433262 ||  || — || November 2, 2007 || Mount Lemmon || Mount Lemmon Survey || — || align=right | 3.7 km || 
|-id=263 bgcolor=#d6d6d6
| 433263 ||  || — || June 24, 2011 || Mount Lemmon || Mount Lemmon Survey || — || align=right | 2.7 km || 
|-id=264 bgcolor=#d6d6d6
| 433264 ||  || — || November 3, 2007 || Mount Lemmon || Mount Lemmon Survey || — || align=right | 3.7 km || 
|-id=265 bgcolor=#E9E9E9
| 433265 ||  || — || November 19, 2003 || Anderson Mesa || LONEOS || — || align=right | 2.9 km || 
|-id=266 bgcolor=#d6d6d6
| 433266 ||  || — || October 19, 2007 || Mount Lemmon || Mount Lemmon Survey || — || align=right | 4.1 km || 
|-id=267 bgcolor=#d6d6d6
| 433267 ||  || — || December 17, 2007 || Mount Lemmon || Mount Lemmon Survey || — || align=right | 3.8 km || 
|-id=268 bgcolor=#d6d6d6
| 433268 ||  || — || May 25, 2001 || Kitt Peak || Spacewatch || — || align=right | 2.8 km || 
|-id=269 bgcolor=#C2FFFF
| 433269 ||  || — || March 18, 2004 || Kitt Peak || Spacewatch || L4 || align=right | 8.1 km || 
|-id=270 bgcolor=#C2FFFF
| 433270 ||  || — || January 5, 2013 || Kitt Peak || Spacewatch || L4 || align=right | 11 km || 
|-id=271 bgcolor=#C2FFFF
| 433271 ||  || — || October 13, 2010 || Mount Lemmon || Mount Lemmon Survey || L4 || align=right | 7.2 km || 
|-id=272 bgcolor=#C2FFFF
| 433272 ||  || — || November 10, 2010 || Mount Lemmon || Mount Lemmon Survey || L4 || align=right | 7.7 km || 
|-id=273 bgcolor=#C2FFFF
| 433273 ||  || — || January 10, 2013 || Mount Lemmon || Mount Lemmon Survey || L4 || align=right | 14 km || 
|-id=274 bgcolor=#C2FFFF
| 433274 ||  || — || October 20, 2012 || Mount Lemmon || Mount Lemmon Survey || L4 || align=right | 10 km || 
|-id=275 bgcolor=#C2FFFF
| 433275 ||  || — || September 4, 2008 || Kitt Peak || Spacewatch || L4 || align=right | 10 km || 
|-id=276 bgcolor=#C2FFFF
| 433276 ||  || — || January 18, 2010 || WISE || WISE || L4 || align=right | 10 km || 
|-id=277 bgcolor=#C2FFFF
| 433277 ||  || — || November 8, 2010 || Mount Lemmon || Mount Lemmon Survey || L4 || align=right | 7.6 km || 
|-id=278 bgcolor=#C2FFFF
| 433278 ||  || — || February 20, 2002 || Kitt Peak || Spacewatch || L4 || align=right | 6.8 km || 
|-id=279 bgcolor=#C2FFFF
| 433279 ||  || — || December 2, 2010 || Mount Lemmon || Mount Lemmon Survey || L4 || align=right | 9.2 km || 
|-id=280 bgcolor=#C2FFFF
| 433280 ||  || — || January 5, 2013 || Kitt Peak || Spacewatch || L4 || align=right | 11 km || 
|-id=281 bgcolor=#C2FFFF
| 433281 ||  || — || September 24, 2009 || Mount Lemmon || Mount Lemmon Survey || L4 || align=right | 7.0 km || 
|-id=282 bgcolor=#C2FFFF
| 433282 ||  || — || October 30, 2010 || Mount Lemmon || Mount Lemmon Survey || L4 || align=right | 7.0 km || 
|-id=283 bgcolor=#C2FFFF
| 433283 ||  || — || September 27, 2009 || Mount Lemmon || Mount Lemmon Survey || L4 || align=right | 7.8 km || 
|-id=284 bgcolor=#C2FFFF
| 433284 ||  || — || September 16, 2009 || Kitt Peak || Spacewatch || L4 || align=right | 7.2 km || 
|-id=285 bgcolor=#C2FFFF
| 433285 ||  || — || November 12, 2012 || Mount Lemmon || Mount Lemmon Survey || L4 || align=right | 7.4 km || 
|-id=286 bgcolor=#C2FFFF
| 433286 ||  || — || August 24, 2008 || Kitt Peak || Spacewatch || L4 || align=right | 8.0 km || 
|-id=287 bgcolor=#C2FFFF
| 433287 ||  || — || September 15, 2009 || Kitt Peak || Spacewatch || L4 || align=right | 7.3 km || 
|-id=288 bgcolor=#C2FFFF
| 433288 ||  || — || September 27, 2009 || Mount Lemmon || Mount Lemmon Survey || L4 || align=right | 7.9 km || 
|-id=289 bgcolor=#C2FFFF
| 433289 ||  || — || October 17, 2010 || Mount Lemmon || Mount Lemmon Survey || L4 || align=right | 7.8 km || 
|-id=290 bgcolor=#C2FFFF
| 433290 ||  || — || January 16, 2010 || WISE || WISE || L4 || align=right | 12 km || 
|-id=291 bgcolor=#C2FFFF
| 433291 ||  || — || September 29, 2009 || Mount Lemmon || Mount Lemmon Survey || L4 || align=right | 7.8 km || 
|-id=292 bgcolor=#C2FFFF
| 433292 ||  || — || September 29, 2009 || Mount Lemmon || Mount Lemmon Survey || L4 || align=right | 8.5 km || 
|-id=293 bgcolor=#C2FFFF
| 433293 ||  || — || November 8, 2010 || Kitt Peak || Spacewatch || L4 || align=right | 8.5 km || 
|-id=294 bgcolor=#C2FFFF
| 433294 ||  || — || September 14, 2007 || Kitt Peak || Spacewatch || L4 || align=right | 6.9 km || 
|-id=295 bgcolor=#C2FFFF
| 433295 ||  || — || July 29, 2008 || Mount Lemmon || Mount Lemmon Survey || L4 || align=right | 7.8 km || 
|-id=296 bgcolor=#C2FFFF
| 433296 ||  || — || September 29, 2009 || Kitt Peak || Spacewatch || L4 || align=right | 7.7 km || 
|-id=297 bgcolor=#C2FFFF
| 433297 ||  || — || October 26, 2009 || Mount Lemmon || Mount Lemmon Survey || L4 || align=right | 7.4 km || 
|-id=298 bgcolor=#C2FFFF
| 433298 ||  || — || November 1, 2010 || Kitt Peak || Spacewatch || L4 || align=right | 9.9 km || 
|-id=299 bgcolor=#fefefe
| 433299 ||  || — || September 22, 2006 || Anderson Mesa || LONEOS || H || align=right data-sort-value="0.76" | 760 m || 
|-id=300 bgcolor=#fefefe
| 433300 ||  || — || March 1, 2009 || Kitt Peak || Spacewatch || — || align=right data-sort-value="0.73" | 730 m || 
|}

433301–433400 

|-bgcolor=#fefefe
| 433301 ||  || — || July 3, 2008 || Siding Spring || SSS || H || align=right data-sort-value="0.93" | 930 m || 
|-id=302 bgcolor=#fefefe
| 433302 ||  || — || December 5, 2005 || Mount Lemmon || Mount Lemmon Survey || H || align=right data-sort-value="0.87" | 870 m || 
|-id=303 bgcolor=#FFC2E0
| 433303 || 2013 NX || — || July 2, 2013 || Haleakala || Pan-STARRS || APOfastcritical || align=right data-sort-value="0.14" | 140 m || 
|-id=304 bgcolor=#E9E9E9
| 433304 ||  || — || January 13, 2011 || Catalina || CSS || EUN || align=right | 1.4 km || 
|-id=305 bgcolor=#E9E9E9
| 433305 ||  || — || March 5, 2006 || Kitt Peak || Spacewatch || — || align=right | 2.1 km || 
|-id=306 bgcolor=#d6d6d6
| 433306 ||  || — || August 30, 2002 || Anderson Mesa || LONEOS || — || align=right | 4.0 km || 
|-id=307 bgcolor=#FA8072
| 433307 ||  || — || September 12, 2005 || Kitt Peak || Spacewatch || H || align=right data-sort-value="0.65" | 650 m || 
|-id=308 bgcolor=#fefefe
| 433308 ||  || — || May 21, 2010 || Mount Lemmon || Mount Lemmon Survey || H || align=right data-sort-value="0.56" | 560 m || 
|-id=309 bgcolor=#E9E9E9
| 433309 ||  || — || December 11, 2010 || Kitt Peak || Spacewatch || — || align=right | 2.5 km || 
|-id=310 bgcolor=#d6d6d6
| 433310 ||  || — || December 5, 2002 || Kitt Peak || Spacewatch || THB || align=right | 3.1 km || 
|-id=311 bgcolor=#fefefe
| 433311 ||  || — || January 26, 2004 || Anderson Mesa || LONEOS || — || align=right | 1.0 km || 
|-id=312 bgcolor=#fefefe
| 433312 ||  || — || January 10, 2011 || Mount Lemmon || Mount Lemmon Survey || — || align=right data-sort-value="0.91" | 910 m || 
|-id=313 bgcolor=#fefefe
| 433313 ||  || — || January 8, 2011 || Mount Lemmon || Mount Lemmon Survey || — || align=right data-sort-value="0.82" | 820 m || 
|-id=314 bgcolor=#fefefe
| 433314 ||  || — || November 15, 2010 || Mount Lemmon || Mount Lemmon Survey || — || align=right data-sort-value="0.73" | 730 m || 
|-id=315 bgcolor=#d6d6d6
| 433315 ||  || — || April 2, 2005 || Mount Lemmon || Mount Lemmon Survey || — || align=right | 2.9 km || 
|-id=316 bgcolor=#fefefe
| 433316 ||  || — || January 4, 2011 || Mount Lemmon || Mount Lemmon Survey || — || align=right | 1.1 km || 
|-id=317 bgcolor=#fefefe
| 433317 ||  || — || April 8, 2008 || Mount Lemmon || Mount Lemmon Survey || — || align=right data-sort-value="0.98" | 980 m || 
|-id=318 bgcolor=#fefefe
| 433318 ||  || — || October 16, 1998 || Kitt Peak || Spacewatch || — || align=right data-sort-value="0.77" | 770 m || 
|-id=319 bgcolor=#fefefe
| 433319 ||  || — || September 16, 2006 || Catalina || CSS || — || align=right data-sort-value="0.87" | 870 m || 
|-id=320 bgcolor=#fefefe
| 433320 ||  || — || February 3, 2012 || Mount Lemmon || Mount Lemmon Survey || — || align=right data-sort-value="0.59" | 590 m || 
|-id=321 bgcolor=#fefefe
| 433321 ||  || — || May 8, 2005 || Kitt Peak || Spacewatch || H || align=right data-sort-value="0.68" | 680 m || 
|-id=322 bgcolor=#fefefe
| 433322 ||  || — || September 7, 2008 || Mount Lemmon || Mount Lemmon Survey || H || align=right data-sort-value="0.65" | 650 m || 
|-id=323 bgcolor=#fefefe
| 433323 ||  || — || July 30, 2009 || Catalina || CSS || — || align=right | 1.00 km || 
|-id=324 bgcolor=#fefefe
| 433324 ||  || — || April 11, 2005 || Kitt Peak || Spacewatch || V || align=right data-sort-value="0.64" | 640 m || 
|-id=325 bgcolor=#E9E9E9
| 433325 ||  || — || December 4, 2005 || Kitt Peak || Spacewatch || — || align=right | 2.3 km || 
|-id=326 bgcolor=#d6d6d6
| 433326 ||  || — || November 8, 2008 || Mount Lemmon || Mount Lemmon Survey || — || align=right | 2.1 km || 
|-id=327 bgcolor=#fefefe
| 433327 ||  || — || October 4, 1999 || Socorro || LINEAR || — || align=right data-sort-value="0.74" | 740 m || 
|-id=328 bgcolor=#fefefe
| 433328 ||  || — || December 6, 2010 || Kitt Peak || Spacewatch || — || align=right data-sort-value="0.87" | 870 m || 
|-id=329 bgcolor=#fefefe
| 433329 ||  || — || March 12, 2007 || Kitt Peak || Spacewatch || H || align=right data-sort-value="0.76" | 760 m || 
|-id=330 bgcolor=#fefefe
| 433330 ||  || — || January 17, 2007 || Mount Lemmon || Mount Lemmon Survey || H || align=right data-sort-value="0.72" | 720 m || 
|-id=331 bgcolor=#fefefe
| 433331 ||  || — || August 18, 2006 || Kitt Peak || Spacewatch || — || align=right data-sort-value="0.70" | 700 m || 
|-id=332 bgcolor=#fefefe
| 433332 ||  || — || January 28, 2011 || Mount Lemmon || Mount Lemmon Survey || NYS || align=right data-sort-value="0.59" | 590 m || 
|-id=333 bgcolor=#fefefe
| 433333 ||  || — || July 30, 2009 || Kitt Peak || Spacewatch || — || align=right | 1.1 km || 
|-id=334 bgcolor=#fefefe
| 433334 ||  || — || September 4, 2013 || Mount Lemmon || Mount Lemmon Survey || — || align=right data-sort-value="0.76" | 760 m || 
|-id=335 bgcolor=#fefefe
| 433335 ||  || — || January 16, 2011 || Mount Lemmon || Mount Lemmon Survey || NYS || align=right data-sort-value="0.70" | 700 m || 
|-id=336 bgcolor=#d6d6d6
| 433336 ||  || — || September 23, 2008 || Kitt Peak || Spacewatch || — || align=right | 3.1 km || 
|-id=337 bgcolor=#fefefe
| 433337 ||  || — || February 25, 2011 || Mount Lemmon || Mount Lemmon Survey || MAS || align=right data-sort-value="0.67" | 670 m || 
|-id=338 bgcolor=#fefefe
| 433338 ||  || — || November 15, 2006 || Mount Lemmon || Mount Lemmon Survey || MAS || align=right data-sort-value="0.85" | 850 m || 
|-id=339 bgcolor=#fefefe
| 433339 ||  || — || October 28, 2008 || Catalina || CSS || H || align=right data-sort-value="0.76" | 760 m || 
|-id=340 bgcolor=#fefefe
| 433340 ||  || — || October 24, 2003 || Socorro || LINEAR || — || align=right data-sort-value="0.68" | 680 m || 
|-id=341 bgcolor=#fefefe
| 433341 ||  || — || January 23, 2011 || Mount Lemmon || Mount Lemmon Survey || MAS || align=right data-sort-value="0.77" | 770 m || 
|-id=342 bgcolor=#E9E9E9
| 433342 ||  || — || March 14, 2007 || Kitt Peak || Spacewatch || — || align=right | 1.8 km || 
|-id=343 bgcolor=#fefefe
| 433343 ||  || — || September 25, 2006 || Mount Lemmon || Mount Lemmon Survey || — || align=right data-sort-value="0.68" | 680 m || 
|-id=344 bgcolor=#E9E9E9
| 433344 ||  || — || October 1, 2009 || Mount Lemmon || Mount Lemmon Survey || — || align=right | 2.7 km || 
|-id=345 bgcolor=#fefefe
| 433345 ||  || — || September 18, 2003 || Kitt Peak || Spacewatch || — || align=right data-sort-value="0.64" | 640 m || 
|-id=346 bgcolor=#fefefe
| 433346 ||  || — || April 28, 2012 || Mount Lemmon || Mount Lemmon Survey || — || align=right data-sort-value="0.70" | 700 m || 
|-id=347 bgcolor=#E9E9E9
| 433347 ||  || — || August 17, 2009 || Kitt Peak || Spacewatch || EUN || align=right data-sort-value="0.80" | 800 m || 
|-id=348 bgcolor=#E9E9E9
| 433348 ||  || — || September 12, 2013 || Mount Lemmon || Mount Lemmon Survey || — || align=right | 2.0 km || 
|-id=349 bgcolor=#fefefe
| 433349 ||  || — || August 27, 2009 || Kitt Peak || Spacewatch || — || align=right data-sort-value="0.84" | 840 m || 
|-id=350 bgcolor=#E9E9E9
| 433350 ||  || — || December 18, 2001 || Socorro || LINEAR || — || align=right data-sort-value="0.94" | 940 m || 
|-id=351 bgcolor=#E9E9E9
| 433351 ||  || — || November 10, 1999 || Kitt Peak || Spacewatch || DOR || align=right | 1.9 km || 
|-id=352 bgcolor=#fefefe
| 433352 ||  || — || August 19, 2006 || Kitt Peak || Spacewatch || — || align=right data-sort-value="0.66" | 660 m || 
|-id=353 bgcolor=#fefefe
| 433353 ||  || — || October 19, 2006 || Catalina || CSS || — || align=right data-sort-value="0.74" | 740 m || 
|-id=354 bgcolor=#E9E9E9
| 433354 ||  || — || September 21, 2009 || Kitt Peak || Spacewatch || — || align=right data-sort-value="0.79" | 790 m || 
|-id=355 bgcolor=#fefefe
| 433355 ||  || — || December 27, 2006 || Mount Lemmon || Mount Lemmon Survey || NYS || align=right data-sort-value="0.61" | 610 m || 
|-id=356 bgcolor=#fefefe
| 433356 ||  || — || August 21, 2006 || Kitt Peak || Spacewatch || — || align=right data-sort-value="0.61" | 610 m || 
|-id=357 bgcolor=#E9E9E9
| 433357 ||  || — || October 18, 2009 || Catalina || CSS || — || align=right | 1.5 km || 
|-id=358 bgcolor=#fefefe
| 433358 ||  || — || January 27, 2007 || Mount Lemmon || Mount Lemmon Survey || NYS || align=right data-sort-value="0.67" | 670 m || 
|-id=359 bgcolor=#E9E9E9
| 433359 ||  || — || June 30, 2008 || Kitt Peak || Spacewatch || — || align=right | 2.4 km || 
|-id=360 bgcolor=#E9E9E9
| 433360 ||  || — || October 15, 2001 || Socorro || LINEAR || EUN || align=right | 1.1 km || 
|-id=361 bgcolor=#E9E9E9
| 433361 ||  || — || September 17, 2004 || Kitt Peak || Spacewatch || GEF || align=right data-sort-value="0.92" | 920 m || 
|-id=362 bgcolor=#E9E9E9
| 433362 ||  || — || November 9, 2009 || Catalina || CSS || ADE || align=right | 2.2 km || 
|-id=363 bgcolor=#E9E9E9
| 433363 ||  || — || August 3, 2000 || Kitt Peak || Spacewatch || — || align=right | 1.5 km || 
|-id=364 bgcolor=#fefefe
| 433364 ||  || — || November 15, 2010 || Mount Lemmon || Mount Lemmon Survey || — || align=right data-sort-value="0.70" | 700 m || 
|-id=365 bgcolor=#fefefe
| 433365 ||  || — || December 15, 2006 || Kitt Peak || Spacewatch || MAS || align=right data-sort-value="0.62" | 620 m || 
|-id=366 bgcolor=#d6d6d6
| 433366 ||  || — || February 25, 2011 || Mount Lemmon || Mount Lemmon Survey || — || align=right | 2.6 km || 
|-id=367 bgcolor=#fefefe
| 433367 ||  || — || December 15, 2006 || Kitt Peak || Spacewatch || NYS || align=right data-sort-value="0.64" | 640 m || 
|-id=368 bgcolor=#d6d6d6
| 433368 ||  || — || August 9, 2007 || Kitt Peak || Spacewatch || — || align=right | 2.8 km || 
|-id=369 bgcolor=#d6d6d6
| 433369 ||  || — || November 19, 2008 || Mount Lemmon || Mount Lemmon Survey || — || align=right | 2.8 km || 
|-id=370 bgcolor=#E9E9E9
| 433370 ||  || — || January 23, 2006 || Kitt Peak || Spacewatch || (1547) || align=right | 1.5 km || 
|-id=371 bgcolor=#E9E9E9
| 433371 ||  || — || September 10, 2004 || Socorro || LINEAR || — || align=right | 2.0 km || 
|-id=372 bgcolor=#E9E9E9
| 433372 ||  || — || May 29, 2012 || Mount Lemmon || Mount Lemmon Survey || — || align=right | 1.2 km || 
|-id=373 bgcolor=#E9E9E9
| 433373 ||  || — || October 29, 2005 || Kitt Peak || Spacewatch || — || align=right data-sort-value="0.79" | 790 m || 
|-id=374 bgcolor=#fefefe
| 433374 ||  || — || December 2, 2010 || Mount Lemmon || Mount Lemmon Survey || — || align=right data-sort-value="0.62" | 620 m || 
|-id=375 bgcolor=#d6d6d6
| 433375 ||  || — || September 7, 2008 || Catalina || CSS || — || align=right | 2.4 km || 
|-id=376 bgcolor=#E9E9E9
| 433376 ||  || — || December 28, 2005 || Mount Lemmon || Mount Lemmon Survey || — || align=right | 1.5 km || 
|-id=377 bgcolor=#E9E9E9
| 433377 ||  || — || January 16, 2011 || Mount Lemmon || Mount Lemmon Survey || — || align=right | 2.0 km || 
|-id=378 bgcolor=#fefefe
| 433378 ||  || — || February 19, 2012 || Catalina || CSS || H || align=right data-sort-value="0.85" | 850 m || 
|-id=379 bgcolor=#E9E9E9
| 433379 ||  || — || April 5, 2011 || Mount Lemmon || Mount Lemmon Survey || EUN || align=right | 1.2 km || 
|-id=380 bgcolor=#fefefe
| 433380 ||  || — || October 18, 2006 || Kitt Peak || Spacewatch || — || align=right data-sort-value="0.71" | 710 m || 
|-id=381 bgcolor=#fefefe
| 433381 ||  || — || October 17, 2010 || Mount Lemmon || Mount Lemmon Survey || — || align=right data-sort-value="0.45" | 450 m || 
|-id=382 bgcolor=#fefefe
| 433382 ||  || — || October 16, 2003 || Anderson Mesa || LONEOS || — || align=right data-sort-value="0.73" | 730 m || 
|-id=383 bgcolor=#fefefe
| 433383 ||  || — || January 29, 2011 || Mount Lemmon || Mount Lemmon Survey || V || align=right data-sort-value="0.65" | 650 m || 
|-id=384 bgcolor=#fefefe
| 433384 ||  || — || September 17, 2006 || Anderson Mesa || LONEOS || — || align=right data-sort-value="0.81" | 810 m || 
|-id=385 bgcolor=#fefefe
| 433385 ||  || — || January 27, 2007 || Kitt Peak || Spacewatch || — || align=right data-sort-value="0.86" | 860 m || 
|-id=386 bgcolor=#fefefe
| 433386 ||  || — || October 13, 2006 || Kitt Peak || Spacewatch || — || align=right data-sort-value="0.69" | 690 m || 
|-id=387 bgcolor=#fefefe
| 433387 ||  || — || October 3, 1999 || Kitt Peak || Spacewatch || — || align=right data-sort-value="0.73" | 730 m || 
|-id=388 bgcolor=#d6d6d6
| 433388 ||  || — || April 8, 2006 || Kitt Peak || Spacewatch || BRA || align=right | 1.4 km || 
|-id=389 bgcolor=#fefefe
| 433389 ||  || — || April 2, 2005 || Mount Lemmon || Mount Lemmon Survey || — || align=right data-sort-value="0.66" | 660 m || 
|-id=390 bgcolor=#d6d6d6
| 433390 ||  || — || September 7, 2008 || Mount Lemmon || Mount Lemmon Survey || — || align=right | 2.3 km || 
|-id=391 bgcolor=#FA8072
| 433391 ||  || — || May 14, 2005 || Mount Lemmon || Mount Lemmon Survey || H || align=right data-sort-value="0.55" | 550 m || 
|-id=392 bgcolor=#E9E9E9
| 433392 ||  || — || April 29, 2012 || Mount Lemmon || Mount Lemmon Survey || — || align=right | 2.4 km || 
|-id=393 bgcolor=#d6d6d6
| 433393 ||  || — || September 12, 2007 || Catalina || CSS || LIX || align=right | 3.5 km || 
|-id=394 bgcolor=#E9E9E9
| 433394 ||  || — || August 23, 2004 || Kitt Peak || Spacewatch || — || align=right | 1.5 km || 
|-id=395 bgcolor=#E9E9E9
| 433395 ||  || — || November 18, 2009 || Catalina || CSS || — || align=right | 1.4 km || 
|-id=396 bgcolor=#E9E9E9
| 433396 ||  || — || September 30, 2000 || Kitt Peak || Spacewatch || — || align=right | 1.4 km || 
|-id=397 bgcolor=#d6d6d6
| 433397 ||  || — || January 2, 2009 || Catalina || CSS || — || align=right | 3.0 km || 
|-id=398 bgcolor=#fefefe
| 433398 ||  || — || October 18, 2003 || Kitt Peak || Spacewatch || — || align=right data-sort-value="0.68" | 680 m || 
|-id=399 bgcolor=#E9E9E9
| 433399 ||  || — || September 20, 2009 || Kitt Peak || Spacewatch || — || align=right data-sort-value="0.73" | 730 m || 
|-id=400 bgcolor=#d6d6d6
| 433400 ||  || — || September 16, 2003 || Kitt Peak || Spacewatch || KOR || align=right | 1.1 km || 
|}

433401–433500 

|-bgcolor=#E9E9E9
| 433401 ||  || — || November 5, 2005 || Mount Lemmon || Mount Lemmon Survey || — || align=right data-sort-value="0.88" | 880 m || 
|-id=402 bgcolor=#E9E9E9
| 433402 ||  || — || December 2, 2005 || Mount Lemmon || Mount Lemmon Survey || — || align=right data-sort-value="0.91" | 910 m || 
|-id=403 bgcolor=#E9E9E9
| 433403 ||  || — || March 30, 2011 || Mount Lemmon || Mount Lemmon Survey || — || align=right | 1.2 km || 
|-id=404 bgcolor=#fefefe
| 433404 ||  || — || September 28, 2003 || Kitt Peak || Spacewatch || — || align=right data-sort-value="0.60" | 600 m || 
|-id=405 bgcolor=#fefefe
| 433405 ||  || — || April 21, 2009 || Kitt Peak || Spacewatch || — || align=right data-sort-value="0.63" | 630 m || 
|-id=406 bgcolor=#E9E9E9
| 433406 ||  || — || October 9, 2004 || Kitt Peak || Spacewatch || MRX || align=right data-sort-value="0.93" | 930 m || 
|-id=407 bgcolor=#fefefe
| 433407 ||  || — || December 11, 1998 || Kitt Peak || Spacewatch || — || align=right data-sort-value="0.76" | 760 m || 
|-id=408 bgcolor=#E9E9E9
| 433408 ||  || — || March 26, 2007 || Kitt Peak || Spacewatch || — || align=right | 1.6 km || 
|-id=409 bgcolor=#d6d6d6
| 433409 ||  || — || March 14, 2005 || Mount Lemmon || Mount Lemmon Survey || — || align=right | 3.0 km || 
|-id=410 bgcolor=#d6d6d6
| 433410 ||  || — || May 10, 2005 || Kitt Peak || Spacewatch || — || align=right | 3.6 km || 
|-id=411 bgcolor=#fefefe
| 433411 ||  || — || April 2, 2000 || Kitt Peak || Spacewatch || — || align=right data-sort-value="0.83" | 830 m || 
|-id=412 bgcolor=#fefefe
| 433412 ||  || — || November 11, 2010 || Mount Lemmon || Mount Lemmon Survey || — || align=right data-sort-value="0.71" | 710 m || 
|-id=413 bgcolor=#fefefe
| 433413 ||  || — || February 12, 2008 || Mount Lemmon || Mount Lemmon Survey || critical || align=right data-sort-value="0.62" | 620 m || 
|-id=414 bgcolor=#fefefe
| 433414 ||  || — || April 14, 2008 || Mount Lemmon || Mount Lemmon Survey || — || align=right data-sort-value="0.79" | 790 m || 
|-id=415 bgcolor=#E9E9E9
| 433415 ||  || — || October 17, 1995 || Kitt Peak || Spacewatch || — || align=right | 1.8 km || 
|-id=416 bgcolor=#fefefe
| 433416 ||  || — || August 18, 2009 || Kitt Peak || Spacewatch || — || align=right data-sort-value="0.95" | 950 m || 
|-id=417 bgcolor=#fefefe
| 433417 ||  || — || October 19, 2006 || Mount Lemmon || Mount Lemmon Survey || — || align=right data-sort-value="0.96" | 960 m || 
|-id=418 bgcolor=#fefefe
| 433418 ||  || — || August 27, 2009 || Catalina || CSS || — || align=right data-sort-value="0.77" | 770 m || 
|-id=419 bgcolor=#fefefe
| 433419 ||  || — || August 25, 2000 || Kitt Peak || Spacewatch || — || align=right data-sort-value="0.71" | 710 m || 
|-id=420 bgcolor=#E9E9E9
| 433420 ||  || — || September 3, 2013 || Kitt Peak || Spacewatch || — || align=right | 1.0 km || 
|-id=421 bgcolor=#d6d6d6
| 433421 ||  || — || December 21, 2008 || Mount Lemmon || Mount Lemmon Survey || — || align=right | 2.1 km || 
|-id=422 bgcolor=#fefefe
| 433422 ||  || — || September 18, 2006 || Kitt Peak || Spacewatch || — || align=right data-sort-value="0.69" | 690 m || 
|-id=423 bgcolor=#fefefe
| 433423 ||  || — || March 15, 2004 || Kitt Peak || Spacewatch || V || align=right data-sort-value="0.62" | 620 m || 
|-id=424 bgcolor=#E9E9E9
| 433424 ||  || — || October 7, 2004 || Kitt Peak || Spacewatch || — || align=right | 1.4 km || 
|-id=425 bgcolor=#fefefe
| 433425 ||  || — || July 21, 2006 || Mount Lemmon || Mount Lemmon Survey || — || align=right data-sort-value="0.77" | 770 m || 
|-id=426 bgcolor=#E9E9E9
| 433426 ||  || — || January 5, 2006 || Catalina || CSS || — || align=right | 1.2 km || 
|-id=427 bgcolor=#fefefe
| 433427 ||  || — || March 25, 2012 || Kitt Peak || Spacewatch || — || align=right data-sort-value="0.57" | 570 m || 
|-id=428 bgcolor=#fefefe
| 433428 ||  || — || October 3, 2003 || Kitt Peak || Spacewatch || — || align=right data-sort-value="0.74" | 740 m || 
|-id=429 bgcolor=#fefefe
| 433429 ||  || — || October 2, 1997 || Kitt Peak || Spacewatch || — || align=right data-sort-value="0.51" | 510 m || 
|-id=430 bgcolor=#d6d6d6
| 433430 ||  || — || October 29, 2008 || Kitt Peak || Spacewatch || EOS || align=right | 2.0 km || 
|-id=431 bgcolor=#E9E9E9
| 433431 ||  || — || September 9, 2004 || Socorro || LINEAR || — || align=right | 1.6 km || 
|-id=432 bgcolor=#E9E9E9
| 433432 ||  || — || April 27, 2010 || WISE || WISE || DOR || align=right | 2.7 km || 
|-id=433 bgcolor=#d6d6d6
| 433433 ||  || — || October 2, 2013 || Kitt Peak || Spacewatch || — || align=right | 3.2 km || 
|-id=434 bgcolor=#fefefe
| 433434 ||  || — || February 23, 2007 || Mount Lemmon || Mount Lemmon Survey || NYS || align=right data-sort-value="0.68" | 680 m || 
|-id=435 bgcolor=#E9E9E9
| 433435 ||  || — || September 6, 2004 || Siding Spring || SSS || — || align=right | 1.3 km || 
|-id=436 bgcolor=#fefefe
| 433436 ||  || — || October 24, 2003 || Kitt Peak || Spacewatch || — || align=right data-sort-value="0.77" | 770 m || 
|-id=437 bgcolor=#E9E9E9
| 433437 ||  || — || November 19, 2009 || Catalina || CSS || — || align=right | 1.8 km || 
|-id=438 bgcolor=#fefefe
| 433438 ||  || — || March 30, 2012 || Kitt Peak || Spacewatch || — || align=right data-sort-value="0.78" | 780 m || 
|-id=439 bgcolor=#E9E9E9
| 433439 ||  || — || December 10, 2004 || Kitt Peak || Spacewatch || — || align=right | 1.8 km || 
|-id=440 bgcolor=#d6d6d6
| 433440 ||  || — || February 15, 2010 || Kitt Peak || Spacewatch || EOS || align=right | 1.9 km || 
|-id=441 bgcolor=#E9E9E9
| 433441 ||  || — || October 30, 2009 || Mount Lemmon || Mount Lemmon Survey || — || align=right | 2.1 km || 
|-id=442 bgcolor=#E9E9E9
| 433442 ||  || — || September 6, 2013 || Mount Lemmon || Mount Lemmon Survey || — || align=right | 2.4 km || 
|-id=443 bgcolor=#fefefe
| 433443 ||  || — || October 15, 2006 || Kitt Peak || Spacewatch || — || align=right data-sort-value="0.60" | 600 m || 
|-id=444 bgcolor=#fefefe
| 433444 ||  || — || March 31, 2008 || Mount Lemmon || Mount Lemmon Survey || V || align=right data-sort-value="0.75" | 750 m || 
|-id=445 bgcolor=#fefefe
| 433445 ||  || — || November 27, 2006 || Mount Lemmon || Mount Lemmon Survey || MAS || align=right data-sort-value="0.73" | 730 m || 
|-id=446 bgcolor=#d6d6d6
| 433446 ||  || — || March 12, 2005 || Mount Lemmon || Mount Lemmon Survey || — || align=right | 3.9 km || 
|-id=447 bgcolor=#E9E9E9
| 433447 ||  || — || March 11, 2007 || Kitt Peak || Spacewatch || — || align=right data-sort-value="0.99" | 990 m || 
|-id=448 bgcolor=#d6d6d6
| 433448 ||  || — || March 21, 2010 || Kitt Peak || Spacewatch || — || align=right | 3.0 km || 
|-id=449 bgcolor=#E9E9E9
| 433449 ||  || — || November 9, 2009 || Kitt Peak || Spacewatch || — || align=right | 1.8 km || 
|-id=450 bgcolor=#d6d6d6
| 433450 ||  || — || September 18, 2007 || Kitt Peak || Spacewatch || — || align=right | 3.1 km || 
|-id=451 bgcolor=#fefefe
| 433451 ||  || — || December 1, 2006 || Mount Lemmon || Mount Lemmon Survey || — || align=right data-sort-value="0.81" | 810 m || 
|-id=452 bgcolor=#E9E9E9
| 433452 ||  || — || March 30, 2011 || Mount Lemmon || Mount Lemmon Survey || — || align=right | 1.6 km || 
|-id=453 bgcolor=#E9E9E9
| 433453 ||  || — || February 25, 2011 || Mount Lemmon || Mount Lemmon Survey || — || align=right | 1.6 km || 
|-id=454 bgcolor=#d6d6d6
| 433454 ||  || — || November 1, 2007 || Mount Lemmon || Mount Lemmon Survey || — || align=right | 3.1 km || 
|-id=455 bgcolor=#d6d6d6
| 433455 ||  || — || October 16, 2007 || Mount Lemmon || Mount Lemmon Survey || — || align=right | 3.1 km || 
|-id=456 bgcolor=#d6d6d6
| 433456 ||  || — || September 7, 2002 || Campo Imperatore || CINEOS || EOS || align=right | 2.0 km || 
|-id=457 bgcolor=#E9E9E9
| 433457 ||  || — || December 18, 2009 || Mount Lemmon || Mount Lemmon Survey || — || align=right | 2.0 km || 
|-id=458 bgcolor=#E9E9E9
| 433458 ||  || — || October 25, 2000 || Socorro || LINEAR || — || align=right | 1.7 km || 
|-id=459 bgcolor=#E9E9E9
| 433459 ||  || — || March 13, 2007 || Mount Lemmon || Mount Lemmon Survey || — || align=right | 2.1 km || 
|-id=460 bgcolor=#E9E9E9
| 433460 ||  || — || November 8, 2009 || Catalina || CSS || — || align=right | 1.3 km || 
|-id=461 bgcolor=#fefefe
| 433461 ||  || — || December 5, 2002 || Socorro || LINEAR || — || align=right data-sort-value="0.92" | 920 m || 
|-id=462 bgcolor=#d6d6d6
| 433462 ||  || — || December 31, 2008 || Kitt Peak || Spacewatch || — || align=right | 2.6 km || 
|-id=463 bgcolor=#fefefe
| 433463 ||  || — || June 21, 2010 || Mount Lemmon || Mount Lemmon Survey || H || align=right data-sort-value="0.59" | 590 m || 
|-id=464 bgcolor=#d6d6d6
| 433464 ||  || — || October 25, 2008 || Kitt Peak || Spacewatch || — || align=right | 2.4 km || 
|-id=465 bgcolor=#fefefe
| 433465 ||  || — || January 15, 2008 || Kitt Peak || Spacewatch || — || align=right data-sort-value="0.89" | 890 m || 
|-id=466 bgcolor=#d6d6d6
| 433466 ||  || — || May 9, 2011 || Mount Lemmon || Mount Lemmon Survey || — || align=right | 3.2 km || 
|-id=467 bgcolor=#d6d6d6
| 433467 ||  || — || September 2, 2008 || Kitt Peak || Spacewatch || — || align=right | 2.3 km || 
|-id=468 bgcolor=#E9E9E9
| 433468 ||  || — || April 18, 2010 || WISE || WISE || — || align=right | 1.3 km || 
|-id=469 bgcolor=#E9E9E9
| 433469 ||  || — || December 30, 2005 || Kitt Peak || Spacewatch || — || align=right | 1.5 km || 
|-id=470 bgcolor=#d6d6d6
| 433470 ||  || — || September 14, 2007 || Kitt Peak || Spacewatch || — || align=right | 4.0 km || 
|-id=471 bgcolor=#E9E9E9
| 433471 ||  || — || October 14, 2009 || Mount Lemmon || Mount Lemmon Survey || — || align=right | 1.5 km || 
|-id=472 bgcolor=#E9E9E9
| 433472 ||  || — || April 1, 2011 || Mount Lemmon || Mount Lemmon Survey || BRG || align=right | 1.6 km || 
|-id=473 bgcolor=#fefefe
| 433473 ||  || — || November 26, 2003 || Kitt Peak || Spacewatch || — || align=right data-sort-value="0.78" | 780 m || 
|-id=474 bgcolor=#fefefe
| 433474 ||  || — || November 24, 2006 || Mount Lemmon || Mount Lemmon Survey || MAS || align=right data-sort-value="0.84" | 840 m || 
|-id=475 bgcolor=#d6d6d6
| 433475 ||  || — || January 18, 2009 || Catalina || CSS || — || align=right | 3.7 km || 
|-id=476 bgcolor=#E9E9E9
| 433476 ||  || — || October 10, 1996 || Kitt Peak || Spacewatch || — || align=right | 2.1 km || 
|-id=477 bgcolor=#fefefe
| 433477 ||  || — || December 19, 2007 || Mount Lemmon || Mount Lemmon Survey || — || align=right data-sort-value="0.74" | 740 m || 
|-id=478 bgcolor=#E9E9E9
| 433478 ||  || — || November 4, 1999 || Kitt Peak || Spacewatch || — || align=right | 2.3 km || 
|-id=479 bgcolor=#E9E9E9
| 433479 ||  || — || October 14, 2013 || Mount Lemmon || Mount Lemmon Survey || (5) || align=right data-sort-value="0.93" | 930 m || 
|-id=480 bgcolor=#E9E9E9
| 433480 ||  || — || October 14, 2013 || Mount Lemmon || Mount Lemmon Survey || — || align=right | 2.2 km || 
|-id=481 bgcolor=#E9E9E9
| 433481 ||  || — || December 10, 2004 || Kitt Peak || Spacewatch || — || align=right | 2.3 km || 
|-id=482 bgcolor=#E9E9E9
| 433482 ||  || — || July 26, 1995 || Kitt Peak || Spacewatch || — || align=right | 1.5 km || 
|-id=483 bgcolor=#E9E9E9
| 433483 ||  || — || January 30, 2006 || Catalina || CSS || — || align=right | 1.5 km || 
|-id=484 bgcolor=#d6d6d6
| 433484 ||  || — || September 9, 2007 || Kitt Peak || Spacewatch || — || align=right | 2.4 km || 
|-id=485 bgcolor=#d6d6d6
| 433485 ||  || — || February 2, 2010 || WISE || WISE || — || align=right | 4.3 km || 
|-id=486 bgcolor=#fefefe
| 433486 ||  || — || March 17, 2004 || Kitt Peak || Spacewatch || — || align=right data-sort-value="0.81" | 810 m || 
|-id=487 bgcolor=#E9E9E9
| 433487 ||  || — || March 12, 2007 || Kitt Peak || Spacewatch || — || align=right | 1.2 km || 
|-id=488 bgcolor=#E9E9E9
| 433488 ||  || — || May 26, 2011 || Mount Lemmon || Mount Lemmon Survey || — || align=right | 2.5 km || 
|-id=489 bgcolor=#E9E9E9
| 433489 ||  || — || April 17, 1998 || Kitt Peak || Spacewatch || — || align=right | 1.9 km || 
|-id=490 bgcolor=#fefefe
| 433490 ||  || — || November 16, 2006 || Kitt Peak || Spacewatch || — || align=right data-sort-value="0.79" | 790 m || 
|-id=491 bgcolor=#fefefe
| 433491 ||  || — || December 6, 2010 || Mount Lemmon || Mount Lemmon Survey || — || align=right data-sort-value="0.66" | 660 m || 
|-id=492 bgcolor=#E9E9E9
| 433492 ||  || — || October 9, 2008 || Mount Lemmon || Mount Lemmon Survey || — || align=right | 3.8 km || 
|-id=493 bgcolor=#d6d6d6
| 433493 ||  || — || October 9, 2007 || Mount Lemmon || Mount Lemmon Survey || — || align=right | 4.6 km || 
|-id=494 bgcolor=#d6d6d6
| 433494 ||  || — || March 18, 2004 || Kitt Peak || Spacewatch || — || align=right | 3.8 km || 
|-id=495 bgcolor=#d6d6d6
| 433495 ||  || — || October 10, 2007 || Mount Lemmon || Mount Lemmon Survey || VER || align=right | 2.9 km || 
|-id=496 bgcolor=#fefefe
| 433496 ||  || — || August 30, 2005 || Kitt Peak || Spacewatch || — || align=right data-sort-value="0.76" | 760 m || 
|-id=497 bgcolor=#E9E9E9
| 433497 ||  || — || January 27, 2006 || Kitt Peak || Spacewatch || — || align=right | 1.8 km || 
|-id=498 bgcolor=#d6d6d6
| 433498 ||  || — || October 26, 2008 || Kitt Peak || Spacewatch || — || align=right | 2.5 km || 
|-id=499 bgcolor=#d6d6d6
| 433499 ||  || — || October 31, 2008 || Catalina || CSS || BRA || align=right | 1.8 km || 
|-id=500 bgcolor=#E9E9E9
| 433500 ||  || — || April 7, 2006 || Kitt Peak || Spacewatch || — || align=right | 2.2 km || 
|}

433501–433600 

|-bgcolor=#E9E9E9
| 433501 ||  || — || March 29, 2011 || Kitt Peak || Spacewatch || EUN || align=right | 1.2 km || 
|-id=502 bgcolor=#E9E9E9
| 433502 ||  || — || January 23, 2006 || Catalina || CSS || — || align=right | 1.7 km || 
|-id=503 bgcolor=#fefefe
| 433503 ||  || — || April 6, 2008 || Mount Lemmon || Mount Lemmon Survey || — || align=right | 1.2 km || 
|-id=504 bgcolor=#E9E9E9
| 433504 ||  || — || March 30, 2011 || Mount Lemmon || Mount Lemmon Survey || — || align=right | 2.2 km || 
|-id=505 bgcolor=#E9E9E9
| 433505 ||  || — || October 27, 2013 || Kitt Peak || Spacewatch || — || align=right | 1.7 km || 
|-id=506 bgcolor=#fefefe
| 433506 ||  || — || September 4, 2000 || Anderson Mesa || LONEOS || — || align=right data-sort-value="0.71" | 710 m || 
|-id=507 bgcolor=#E9E9E9
| 433507 ||  || — || April 1, 2011 || Mount Lemmon || Mount Lemmon Survey || — || align=right data-sort-value="0.96" | 960 m || 
|-id=508 bgcolor=#d6d6d6
| 433508 ||  || — || July 18, 2012 || Catalina || CSS || EOS || align=right | 2.6 km || 
|-id=509 bgcolor=#d6d6d6
| 433509 ||  || — || January 19, 2004 || Kitt Peak || Spacewatch || — || align=right | 2.7 km || 
|-id=510 bgcolor=#d6d6d6
| 433510 ||  || — || October 11, 2007 || Catalina || CSS || — || align=right | 4.3 km || 
|-id=511 bgcolor=#E9E9E9
| 433511 ||  || — || February 10, 1997 || Kitt Peak || Spacewatch || — || align=right | 1.8 km || 
|-id=512 bgcolor=#E9E9E9
| 433512 Hollyholman ||  ||  || November 26, 2009 || Mount Lemmon || Mount Lemmon Survey || (5) || align=right | 1.8 km || 
|-id=513 bgcolor=#E9E9E9
| 433513 ||  || — || May 19, 2012 || Mount Lemmon || Mount Lemmon Survey || — || align=right | 2.1 km || 
|-id=514 bgcolor=#fefefe
| 433514 ||  || — || November 22, 2006 || Mount Lemmon || Mount Lemmon Survey || — || align=right | 1.2 km || 
|-id=515 bgcolor=#E9E9E9
| 433515 ||  || — || October 1, 2000 || Anderson Mesa || LONEOS || — || align=right | 1.5 km || 
|-id=516 bgcolor=#fefefe
| 433516 ||  || — || June 8, 2005 || Kitt Peak || Spacewatch || — || align=right data-sort-value="0.83" | 830 m || 
|-id=517 bgcolor=#E9E9E9
| 433517 ||  || — || November 20, 2009 || Mount Lemmon || Mount Lemmon Survey || — || align=right | 1.7 km || 
|-id=518 bgcolor=#E9E9E9
| 433518 ||  || — || November 11, 2009 || Kitt Peak || Spacewatch || (5) || align=right data-sort-value="0.89" | 890 m || 
|-id=519 bgcolor=#d6d6d6
| 433519 ||  || — || June 17, 2010 || WISE || WISE || EOS || align=right | 2.6 km || 
|-id=520 bgcolor=#E9E9E9
| 433520 ||  || — || October 24, 2004 || Kitt Peak || Spacewatch || — || align=right | 2.1 km || 
|-id=521 bgcolor=#E9E9E9
| 433521 ||  || — || November 9, 2009 || Mount Lemmon || Mount Lemmon Survey || EUN || align=right data-sort-value="0.93" | 930 m || 
|-id=522 bgcolor=#d6d6d6
| 433522 ||  || — || October 26, 2013 || Mount Lemmon || Mount Lemmon Survey || — || align=right | 2.1 km || 
|-id=523 bgcolor=#fefefe
| 433523 ||  || — || May 14, 2008 || Mount Lemmon || Mount Lemmon Survey || — || align=right data-sort-value="0.89" | 890 m || 
|-id=524 bgcolor=#d6d6d6
| 433524 ||  || — || December 18, 2003 || Kitt Peak || Spacewatch || — || align=right | 2.0 km || 
|-id=525 bgcolor=#fefefe
| 433525 ||  || — || September 19, 2009 || Catalina || CSS || — || align=right data-sort-value="0.89" | 890 m || 
|-id=526 bgcolor=#d6d6d6
| 433526 ||  || — || September 10, 2007 || Kitt Peak || Spacewatch || — || align=right | 2.8 km || 
|-id=527 bgcolor=#d6d6d6
| 433527 ||  || — || November 8, 2013 || Catalina || CSS || — || align=right | 3.4 km || 
|-id=528 bgcolor=#E9E9E9
| 433528 ||  || — || May 25, 2007 || Mount Lemmon || Mount Lemmon Survey || — || align=right | 2.0 km || 
|-id=529 bgcolor=#E9E9E9
| 433529 ||  || — || December 2, 2004 || Kitt Peak || Spacewatch || GEF || align=right | 1.0 km || 
|-id=530 bgcolor=#E9E9E9
| 433530 ||  || — || September 23, 2008 || Kitt Peak || Spacewatch || — || align=right | 2.0 km || 
|-id=531 bgcolor=#d6d6d6
| 433531 ||  || — || November 3, 2008 || Mount Lemmon || Mount Lemmon Survey || — || align=right | 2.5 km || 
|-id=532 bgcolor=#E9E9E9
| 433532 ||  || — || December 25, 2009 || Kitt Peak || Spacewatch || — || align=right | 1.4 km || 
|-id=533 bgcolor=#E9E9E9
| 433533 ||  || — || May 22, 2011 || Mount Lemmon || Mount Lemmon Survey || — || align=right | 1.9 km || 
|-id=534 bgcolor=#E9E9E9
| 433534 ||  || — || July 13, 2004 || Siding Spring || SSS || — || align=right | 1.4 km || 
|-id=535 bgcolor=#E9E9E9
| 433535 ||  || — || September 27, 2000 || Socorro || LINEAR || — || align=right | 1.7 km || 
|-id=536 bgcolor=#E9E9E9
| 433536 ||  || — || October 7, 2004 || Kitt Peak || Spacewatch || WIT || align=right | 1.3 km || 
|-id=537 bgcolor=#E9E9E9
| 433537 ||  || — || October 6, 2000 || Kitt Peak || Spacewatch || — || align=right | 1.6 km || 
|-id=538 bgcolor=#E9E9E9
| 433538 ||  || — || January 29, 2011 || Kitt Peak || Spacewatch || MAR || align=right | 1.6 km || 
|-id=539 bgcolor=#d6d6d6
| 433539 ||  || — || August 24, 2001 || Anderson Mesa || LONEOS || — || align=right | 3.4 km || 
|-id=540 bgcolor=#E9E9E9
| 433540 ||  || — || January 19, 2005 || Kitt Peak || Spacewatch || — || align=right | 3.2 km || 
|-id=541 bgcolor=#d6d6d6
| 433541 ||  || — || October 29, 2008 || Mount Lemmon || Mount Lemmon Survey || — || align=right | 3.7 km || 
|-id=542 bgcolor=#d6d6d6
| 433542 ||  || — || July 28, 2006 || Siding Spring || SSS || 7:4 || align=right | 5.1 km || 
|-id=543 bgcolor=#fefefe
| 433543 ||  || — || October 4, 2013 || Kitt Peak || Spacewatch || — || align=right data-sort-value="0.87" | 870 m || 
|-id=544 bgcolor=#E9E9E9
| 433544 ||  || — || January 2, 2006 || Catalina || CSS || — || align=right | 1.8 km || 
|-id=545 bgcolor=#E9E9E9
| 433545 ||  || — || January 24, 2006 || Anderson Mesa || LONEOS || — || align=right | 1.7 km || 
|-id=546 bgcolor=#E9E9E9
| 433546 ||  || — || March 13, 2007 || Mount Lemmon || Mount Lemmon Survey || — || align=right | 1.3 km || 
|-id=547 bgcolor=#d6d6d6
| 433547 ||  || — || May 25, 2006 || Kitt Peak || Spacewatch || — || align=right | 2.9 km || 
|-id=548 bgcolor=#fefefe
| 433548 ||  || — || August 26, 2009 || Catalina || CSS || NYS || align=right data-sort-value="0.63" | 630 m || 
|-id=549 bgcolor=#d6d6d6
| 433549 ||  || — || January 1, 2009 || Mount Lemmon || Mount Lemmon Survey || — || align=right | 3.2 km || 
|-id=550 bgcolor=#E9E9E9
| 433550 ||  || — || October 8, 2008 || Catalina || CSS || — || align=right | 2.2 km || 
|-id=551 bgcolor=#E9E9E9
| 433551 ||  || — || July 25, 2008 || Siding Spring || SSS || — || align=right | 2.7 km || 
|-id=552 bgcolor=#E9E9E9
| 433552 ||  || — || September 21, 2008 || Mount Lemmon || Mount Lemmon Survey || — || align=right | 2.0 km || 
|-id=553 bgcolor=#E9E9E9
| 433553 ||  || — || January 10, 2002 || Campo Imperatore || CINEOS || — || align=right | 1.2 km || 
|-id=554 bgcolor=#fefefe
| 433554 ||  || — || November 21, 1998 || Kitt Peak || Spacewatch || — || align=right | 1.0 km || 
|-id=555 bgcolor=#d6d6d6
| 433555 ||  || — || January 18, 2010 || WISE || WISE || — || align=right | 3.6 km || 
|-id=556 bgcolor=#fefefe
| 433556 ||  || — || December 9, 2006 || Kitt Peak || Spacewatch || — || align=right | 1.00 km || 
|-id=557 bgcolor=#E9E9E9
| 433557 ||  || — || September 24, 2008 || Mount Lemmon || Mount Lemmon Survey || — || align=right | 2.0 km || 
|-id=558 bgcolor=#E9E9E9
| 433558 ||  || — || April 19, 2007 || Mount Lemmon || Mount Lemmon Survey || — || align=right | 2.1 km || 
|-id=559 bgcolor=#E9E9E9
| 433559 ||  || — || October 9, 2004 || Kitt Peak || Spacewatch || ADE || align=right | 2.1 km || 
|-id=560 bgcolor=#E9E9E9
| 433560 ||  || — || March 13, 2011 || Mount Lemmon || Mount Lemmon Survey || — || align=right | 1.1 km || 
|-id=561 bgcolor=#fefefe
| 433561 ||  || — || January 17, 2007 || Kitt Peak || Spacewatch || NYS || align=right data-sort-value="0.76" | 760 m || 
|-id=562 bgcolor=#E9E9E9
| 433562 ||  || — || May 11, 2007 || Kitt Peak || Spacewatch || — || align=right | 2.5 km || 
|-id=563 bgcolor=#d6d6d6
| 433563 ||  || — || December 30, 2008 || Catalina || CSS || — || align=right | 3.5 km || 
|-id=564 bgcolor=#d6d6d6
| 433564 ||  || — || January 11, 2008 || Kitt Peak || Spacewatch || 7:4 || align=right | 3.0 km || 
|-id=565 bgcolor=#E9E9E9
| 433565 ||  || — || December 18, 2004 || Mount Lemmon || Mount Lemmon Survey || MRX || align=right | 1.1 km || 
|-id=566 bgcolor=#d6d6d6
| 433566 ||  || — || April 10, 2010 || Mount Lemmon || Mount Lemmon Survey || — || align=right | 3.8 km || 
|-id=567 bgcolor=#d6d6d6
| 433567 ||  || — || January 13, 2010 || WISE || WISE || — || align=right | 5.1 km || 
|-id=568 bgcolor=#d6d6d6
| 433568 ||  || — || June 15, 2005 || Mount Lemmon || Mount Lemmon Survey || — || align=right | 3.6 km || 
|-id=569 bgcolor=#d6d6d6
| 433569 ||  || — || November 9, 2008 || Mount Lemmon || Mount Lemmon Survey || — || align=right | 3.4 km || 
|-id=570 bgcolor=#E9E9E9
| 433570 ||  || — || October 7, 2004 || Kitt Peak || Spacewatch || — || align=right | 1.2 km || 
|-id=571 bgcolor=#d6d6d6
| 433571 ||  || — || October 11, 2012 || Mount Lemmon || Mount Lemmon Survey || — || align=right | 2.7 km || 
|-id=572 bgcolor=#d6d6d6
| 433572 ||  || — || September 12, 2007 || Mount Lemmon || Mount Lemmon Survey || — || align=right | 2.1 km || 
|-id=573 bgcolor=#d6d6d6
| 433573 ||  || — || March 3, 2009 || Kitt Peak || Spacewatch || THM || align=right | 2.1 km || 
|-id=574 bgcolor=#d6d6d6
| 433574 ||  || — || January 1, 2008 || Mount Lemmon || Mount Lemmon Survey || — || align=right | 4.2 km || 
|-id=575 bgcolor=#d6d6d6
| 433575 ||  || — || February 24, 2010 || WISE || WISE || — || align=right | 2.9 km || 
|-id=576 bgcolor=#fefefe
| 433576 ||  || — || September 14, 2005 || Catalina || CSS || — || align=right data-sort-value="0.91" | 910 m || 
|-id=577 bgcolor=#d6d6d6
| 433577 ||  || — || December 19, 2007 || Mount Lemmon || Mount Lemmon Survey || — || align=right | 3.6 km || 
|-id=578 bgcolor=#E9E9E9
| 433578 ||  || — || December 18, 2001 || Socorro || LINEAR || — || align=right | 1.2 km || 
|-id=579 bgcolor=#d6d6d6
| 433579 ||  || — || November 21, 2008 || Mount Lemmon || Mount Lemmon Survey || — || align=right | 3.1 km || 
|-id=580 bgcolor=#d6d6d6
| 433580 ||  || — || April 15, 2010 || Kitt Peak || Spacewatch || EOS || align=right | 2.2 km || 
|-id=581 bgcolor=#d6d6d6
| 433581 ||  || — || April 2, 2005 || Kitt Peak || Spacewatch || — || align=right | 2.7 km || 
|-id=582 bgcolor=#fefefe
| 433582 ||  || — || May 14, 2008 || Mount Lemmon || Mount Lemmon Survey || — || align=right data-sort-value="0.94" | 940 m || 
|-id=583 bgcolor=#d6d6d6
| 433583 ||  || — || January 4, 2003 || Socorro || LINEAR || — || align=right | 3.2 km || 
|-id=584 bgcolor=#E9E9E9
| 433584 ||  || — || April 11, 2010 || WISE || WISE || — || align=right | 2.1 km || 
|-id=585 bgcolor=#fefefe
| 433585 ||  || — || December 13, 1999 || Kitt Peak || Spacewatch || — || align=right data-sort-value="0.82" | 820 m || 
|-id=586 bgcolor=#fefefe
| 433586 ||  || — || July 3, 2005 || Siding Spring || SSS || — || align=right | 1.4 km || 
|-id=587 bgcolor=#E9E9E9
| 433587 ||  || — || January 31, 2006 || Kitt Peak || Spacewatch || — || align=right | 1.3 km || 
|-id=588 bgcolor=#fefefe
| 433588 ||  || — || April 28, 2004 || Kitt Peak || Spacewatch || — || align=right | 1.2 km || 
|-id=589 bgcolor=#d6d6d6
| 433589 ||  || — || December 26, 2013 || Kitt Peak || Spacewatch || EOS || align=right | 1.9 km || 
|-id=590 bgcolor=#E9E9E9
| 433590 ||  || — || May 20, 2006 || Kitt Peak || Spacewatch || — || align=right | 2.1 km || 
|-id=591 bgcolor=#d6d6d6
| 433591 ||  || — || February 4, 2009 || Mount Lemmon || Mount Lemmon Survey || — || align=right | 3.1 km || 
|-id=592 bgcolor=#E9E9E9
| 433592 ||  || — || September 20, 2009 || Mount Lemmon || Mount Lemmon Survey || — || align=right | 1.4 km || 
|-id=593 bgcolor=#d6d6d6
| 433593 ||  || — || January 1, 2009 || Mount Lemmon || Mount Lemmon Survey || — || align=right | 3.1 km || 
|-id=594 bgcolor=#d6d6d6
| 433594 ||  || — || October 20, 2007 || Mount Lemmon || Mount Lemmon Survey || EOS || align=right | 2.1 km || 
|-id=595 bgcolor=#d6d6d6
| 433595 ||  || — || January 1, 2009 || Mount Lemmon || Mount Lemmon Survey || — || align=right | 2.4 km || 
|-id=596 bgcolor=#E9E9E9
| 433596 ||  || — || April 11, 2011 || Mount Lemmon || Mount Lemmon Survey || EUN || align=right | 1.4 km || 
|-id=597 bgcolor=#E9E9E9
| 433597 ||  || — || December 12, 2004 || Kitt Peak || Spacewatch || — || align=right | 2.4 km || 
|-id=598 bgcolor=#E9E9E9
| 433598 ||  || — || May 6, 2006 || Kitt Peak || Spacewatch || — || align=right | 2.4 km || 
|-id=599 bgcolor=#E9E9E9
| 433599 ||  || — || September 22, 2003 || Kitt Peak || Spacewatch || — || align=right | 2.7 km || 
|-id=600 bgcolor=#d6d6d6
| 433600 ||  || — || February 24, 2009 || Mount Lemmon || Mount Lemmon Survey || — || align=right | 3.4 km || 
|}

433601–433700 

|-bgcolor=#fefefe
| 433601 ||  || — || November 20, 2001 || Socorro || LINEAR || MAS || align=right data-sort-value="0.91" | 910 m || 
|-id=602 bgcolor=#d6d6d6
| 433602 ||  || — || December 16, 1993 || Kitt Peak || Spacewatch || — || align=right | 2.9 km || 
|-id=603 bgcolor=#d6d6d6
| 433603 ||  || — || February 19, 2009 || Catalina || CSS || — || align=right | 4.0 km || 
|-id=604 bgcolor=#d6d6d6
| 433604 ||  || — || November 21, 2008 || Kitt Peak || Spacewatch || — || align=right | 2.5 km || 
|-id=605 bgcolor=#E9E9E9
| 433605 ||  || — || December 25, 2013 || Mount Lemmon || Mount Lemmon Survey || — || align=right | 2.7 km || 
|-id=606 bgcolor=#d6d6d6
| 433606 ||  || — || January 17, 2009 || Kitt Peak || Spacewatch || EOS || align=right | 2.1 km || 
|-id=607 bgcolor=#E9E9E9
| 433607 ||  || — || October 20, 2003 || Kitt Peak || Spacewatch || — || align=right | 2.5 km || 
|-id=608 bgcolor=#E9E9E9
| 433608 ||  || — || December 12, 2004 || Kitt Peak || Spacewatch || — || align=right | 2.3 km || 
|-id=609 bgcolor=#E9E9E9
| 433609 ||  || — || August 23, 2008 || Siding Spring || SSS || — || align=right | 1.7 km || 
|-id=610 bgcolor=#fefefe
| 433610 ||  || — || December 17, 2001 || Socorro || LINEAR || — || align=right | 1.0 km || 
|-id=611 bgcolor=#d6d6d6
| 433611 ||  || — || October 22, 2005 || Kitt Peak || Spacewatch || SHU3:2 || align=right | 4.7 km || 
|-id=612 bgcolor=#fefefe
| 433612 ||  || — || December 10, 2009 || Mount Lemmon || Mount Lemmon Survey || V || align=right data-sort-value="0.82" | 820 m || 
|-id=613 bgcolor=#d6d6d6
| 433613 ||  || — || April 13, 2004 || Kitt Peak || Spacewatch || THM || align=right | 2.0 km || 
|-id=614 bgcolor=#d6d6d6
| 433614 ||  || — || March 16, 2005 || Mount Lemmon || Mount Lemmon Survey || KOR || align=right | 1.4 km || 
|-id=615 bgcolor=#d6d6d6
| 433615 ||  || — || October 22, 2012 || Kitt Peak || Spacewatch || 3:2 || align=right | 3.8 km || 
|-id=616 bgcolor=#E9E9E9
| 433616 ||  || — || November 4, 2013 || Kitt Peak || Spacewatch || — || align=right | 2.1 km || 
|-id=617 bgcolor=#fefefe
| 433617 ||  || — || March 27, 2012 || Kitt Peak || Spacewatch || — || align=right data-sort-value="0.82" | 820 m || 
|-id=618 bgcolor=#E9E9E9
| 433618 ||  || — || December 18, 2009 || Mount Lemmon || Mount Lemmon Survey || — || align=right | 1.3 km || 
|-id=619 bgcolor=#E9E9E9
| 433619 ||  || — || January 13, 2005 || Kitt Peak || Spacewatch || — || align=right | 2.0 km || 
|-id=620 bgcolor=#E9E9E9
| 433620 ||  || — || June 3, 2011 || Mount Lemmon || Mount Lemmon Survey || — || align=right | 3.0 km || 
|-id=621 bgcolor=#E9E9E9
| 433621 ||  || — || October 6, 2012 || Catalina || CSS || — || align=right | 2.7 km || 
|-id=622 bgcolor=#E9E9E9
| 433622 ||  || — || January 16, 2000 || Kitt Peak || Spacewatch || AGN || align=right | 1.3 km || 
|-id=623 bgcolor=#d6d6d6
| 433623 ||  || — || January 19, 2009 || Mount Lemmon || Mount Lemmon Survey || — || align=right | 2.5 km || 
|-id=624 bgcolor=#d6d6d6
| 433624 ||  || — || July 4, 2005 || Mount Lemmon || Mount Lemmon Survey || — || align=right | 2.8 km || 
|-id=625 bgcolor=#d6d6d6
| 433625 ||  || — || October 17, 2012 || Mount Lemmon || Mount Lemmon Survey || — || align=right | 2.7 km || 
|-id=626 bgcolor=#E9E9E9
| 433626 ||  || — || October 9, 2008 || Catalina || CSS || — || align=right | 1.7 km || 
|-id=627 bgcolor=#d6d6d6
| 433627 ||  || — || January 31, 2009 || Kitt Peak || Spacewatch || — || align=right | 2.4 km || 
|-id=628 bgcolor=#E9E9E9
| 433628 ||  || — || September 8, 2008 || Siding Spring || SSS || EUN || align=right | 1.4 km || 
|-id=629 bgcolor=#fefefe
| 433629 ||  || — || April 24, 2001 || Kitt Peak || Spacewatch || — || align=right | 1.0 km || 
|-id=630 bgcolor=#d6d6d6
| 433630 ||  || — || October 31, 2007 || Mount Lemmon || Mount Lemmon Survey || EOS || align=right | 1.7 km || 
|-id=631 bgcolor=#d6d6d6
| 433631 ||  || — || February 10, 2010 || WISE || WISE || — || align=right | 3.2 km || 
|-id=632 bgcolor=#d6d6d6
| 433632 ||  || — || October 10, 2007 || Mount Lemmon || Mount Lemmon Survey || — || align=right | 3.2 km || 
|-id=633 bgcolor=#d6d6d6
| 433633 ||  || — || November 3, 2007 || Kitt Peak || Spacewatch || — || align=right | 4.2 km || 
|-id=634 bgcolor=#d6d6d6
| 433634 ||  || — || October 15, 2007 || Mount Lemmon || Mount Lemmon Survey || EOS || align=right | 1.7 km || 
|-id=635 bgcolor=#d6d6d6
| 433635 ||  || — || April 9, 2010 || Mount Lemmon || Mount Lemmon Survey || — || align=right | 4.0 km || 
|-id=636 bgcolor=#d6d6d6
| 433636 ||  || — || September 25, 2006 || Anderson Mesa || LONEOS || HYG || align=right | 3.4 km || 
|-id=637 bgcolor=#E9E9E9
| 433637 ||  || — || October 2, 2008 || Catalina || CSS || — || align=right | 1.9 km || 
|-id=638 bgcolor=#d6d6d6
| 433638 ||  || — || September 13, 2007 || Mount Lemmon || Mount Lemmon Survey || KOR || align=right | 1.5 km || 
|-id=639 bgcolor=#E9E9E9
| 433639 ||  || — || December 20, 2004 || Mount Lemmon || Mount Lemmon Survey || — || align=right | 1.9 km || 
|-id=640 bgcolor=#E9E9E9
| 433640 ||  || — || October 11, 2012 || Mount Lemmon || Mount Lemmon Survey || — || align=right | 2.3 km || 
|-id=641 bgcolor=#d6d6d6
| 433641 ||  || — || December 7, 2002 || Kitt Peak || Spacewatch || — || align=right | 3.2 km || 
|-id=642 bgcolor=#E9E9E9
| 433642 ||  || — || December 26, 2009 || Kitt Peak || Spacewatch || — || align=right | 1.8 km || 
|-id=643 bgcolor=#fefefe
| 433643 ||  || — || August 31, 2000 || Socorro || LINEAR || — || align=right data-sort-value="0.75" | 750 m || 
|-id=644 bgcolor=#E9E9E9
| 433644 ||  || — || August 7, 2008 || Kitt Peak || Spacewatch || — || align=right | 1.5 km || 
|-id=645 bgcolor=#E9E9E9
| 433645 ||  || — || October 7, 2008 || Mount Lemmon || Mount Lemmon Survey || — || align=right | 2.1 km || 
|-id=646 bgcolor=#E9E9E9
| 433646 ||  || — || June 13, 2007 || Kitt Peak || Spacewatch || EUN || align=right | 1.5 km || 
|-id=647 bgcolor=#d6d6d6
| 433647 ||  || — || April 27, 2011 || Mount Lemmon || Mount Lemmon Survey || — || align=right | 4.5 km || 
|-id=648 bgcolor=#d6d6d6
| 433648 ||  || — || February 4, 2009 || Mount Lemmon || Mount Lemmon Survey || — || align=right | 2.7 km || 
|-id=649 bgcolor=#d6d6d6
| 433649 ||  || — || January 31, 2009 || Mount Lemmon || Mount Lemmon Survey || EOS || align=right | 2.1 km || 
|-id=650 bgcolor=#d6d6d6
| 433650 ||  || — || November 21, 2007 || Mount Lemmon || Mount Lemmon Survey || — || align=right | 3.2 km || 
|-id=651 bgcolor=#E9E9E9
| 433651 ||  || — || February 10, 2010 || Kitt Peak || Spacewatch || — || align=right | 2.6 km || 
|-id=652 bgcolor=#fefefe
| 433652 ||  || — || February 16, 2007 || Catalina || CSS || — || align=right | 1.1 km || 
|-id=653 bgcolor=#d6d6d6
| 433653 ||  || — || November 27, 1998 || Kitt Peak || Spacewatch || KOR || align=right | 1.6 km || 
|-id=654 bgcolor=#d6d6d6
| 433654 ||  || — || November 20, 2007 || Catalina || CSS || EOS || align=right | 2.2 km || 
|-id=655 bgcolor=#d6d6d6
| 433655 ||  || — || September 21, 2001 || Kitt Peak || Spacewatch || — || align=right | 2.3 km || 
|-id=656 bgcolor=#E9E9E9
| 433656 ||  || — || October 8, 2004 || Kitt Peak || Spacewatch || — || align=right data-sort-value="0.98" | 980 m || 
|-id=657 bgcolor=#d6d6d6
| 433657 ||  || — || June 11, 2005 || Kitt Peak || Spacewatch || — || align=right | 2.8 km || 
|-id=658 bgcolor=#d6d6d6
| 433658 ||  || — || December 24, 2005 || Kitt Peak || Spacewatch || 3:2 || align=right | 3.5 km || 
|-id=659 bgcolor=#d6d6d6
| 433659 ||  || — || January 20, 2009 || Kitt Peak || Spacewatch || LIX || align=right | 3.7 km || 
|-id=660 bgcolor=#E9E9E9
| 433660 ||  || — || June 17, 2010 || WISE || WISE || — || align=right | 3.2 km || 
|-id=661 bgcolor=#E9E9E9
| 433661 ||  || — || November 21, 2008 || Mount Lemmon || Mount Lemmon Survey || — || align=right | 1.6 km || 
|-id=662 bgcolor=#d6d6d6
| 433662 ||  || — || January 1, 2008 || Kitt Peak || Spacewatch || — || align=right | 4.2 km || 
|-id=663 bgcolor=#d6d6d6
| 433663 ||  || — || December 17, 2001 || Socorro || LINEAR || VER || align=right | 3.9 km || 
|-id=664 bgcolor=#d6d6d6
| 433664 ||  || — || March 16, 2009 || Kitt Peak || Spacewatch || — || align=right | 3.0 km || 
|-id=665 bgcolor=#d6d6d6
| 433665 ||  || — || April 23, 2009 || Catalina || CSS || — || align=right | 4.2 km || 
|-id=666 bgcolor=#d6d6d6
| 433666 ||  || — || January 3, 2009 || Mount Lemmon || Mount Lemmon Survey || — || align=right | 2.5 km || 
|-id=667 bgcolor=#d6d6d6
| 433667 ||  || — || March 8, 2010 || WISE || WISE || — || align=right | 4.4 km || 
|-id=668 bgcolor=#E9E9E9
| 433668 ||  || — || January 19, 2005 || Kitt Peak || Spacewatch || — || align=right | 2.7 km || 
|-id=669 bgcolor=#d6d6d6
| 433669 ||  || — || September 27, 2006 || Kitt Peak || Spacewatch || — || align=right | 3.0 km || 
|-id=670 bgcolor=#C2FFFF
| 433670 ||  || — || January 18, 2010 || WISE || WISE || L4 || align=right | 11 km || 
|-id=671 bgcolor=#C2FFFF
| 433671 ||  || — || September 28, 2009 || Mount Lemmon || Mount Lemmon Survey || L4 || align=right | 7.8 km || 
|-id=672 bgcolor=#C2FFFF
| 433672 ||  || — || October 19, 2010 || Mount Lemmon || Mount Lemmon Survey || L4 || align=right | 7.9 km || 
|-id=673 bgcolor=#d6d6d6
| 433673 ||  || — || November 28, 2000 || Kitt Peak || Spacewatch || — || align=right | 3.9 km || 
|-id=674 bgcolor=#C2FFFF
| 433674 ||  || — || August 7, 2008 || Kitt Peak || Spacewatch || L4 || align=right | 7.1 km || 
|-id=675 bgcolor=#C2FFFF
| 433675 ||  || — || February 27, 2014 || Kitt Peak || Spacewatch || L4 || align=right | 8.5 km || 
|-id=676 bgcolor=#C2FFFF
| 433676 ||  || — || September 25, 2009 || Kitt Peak || Spacewatch || L4 || align=right | 7.6 km || 
|-id=677 bgcolor=#C2FFFF
| 433677 ||  || — || September 7, 2008 || Mount Lemmon || Mount Lemmon Survey || L4 || align=right | 9.4 km || 
|-id=678 bgcolor=#d6d6d6
| 433678 ||  || — || September 25, 2000 || Kitt Peak || Spacewatch || — || align=right | 3.3 km || 
|-id=679 bgcolor=#C2FFFF
| 433679 ||  || — || April 8, 2003 || Kitt Peak || Spacewatch || L4 || align=right | 7.1 km || 
|-id=680 bgcolor=#d6d6d6
| 433680 ||  || — || September 30, 2006 || Mount Lemmon || Mount Lemmon Survey || — || align=right | 3.1 km || 
|-id=681 bgcolor=#C2FFFF
| 433681 ||  || — || December 8, 2010 || Kitt Peak || Spacewatch || L4 || align=right | 8.7 km || 
|-id=682 bgcolor=#fefefe
| 433682 ||  || — || March 18, 2007 || Kitt Peak || Spacewatch || — || align=right data-sort-value="0.74" | 740 m || 
|-id=683 bgcolor=#fefefe
| 433683 ||  || — || January 30, 2004 || Kitt Peak || Spacewatch || — || align=right data-sort-value="0.75" | 750 m || 
|-id=684 bgcolor=#E9E9E9
| 433684 ||  || — || September 13, 2004 || Kitt Peak || Spacewatch || — || align=right | 2.0 km || 
|-id=685 bgcolor=#E9E9E9
| 433685 ||  || — || October 29, 2000 || Kitt Peak || Spacewatch || — || align=right | 2.2 km || 
|-id=686 bgcolor=#E9E9E9
| 433686 ||  || — || November 16, 2006 || Mount Lemmon || Mount Lemmon Survey || — || align=right data-sort-value="0.91" | 910 m || 
|-id=687 bgcolor=#E9E9E9
| 433687 ||  || — || October 7, 2005 || Catalina || CSS || — || align=right | 1.6 km || 
|-id=688 bgcolor=#d6d6d6
| 433688 ||  || — || December 19, 2003 || Socorro || LINEAR || — || align=right | 3.7 km || 
|-id=689 bgcolor=#d6d6d6
| 433689 ||  || — || September 19, 2003 || Kitt Peak || Spacewatch || TEL || align=right | 1.2 km || 
|-id=690 bgcolor=#d6d6d6
| 433690 ||  || — || November 30, 2003 || Kitt Peak || Spacewatch || — || align=right | 3.8 km || 
|-id=691 bgcolor=#d6d6d6
| 433691 ||  || — || September 7, 2008 || Mount Lemmon || Mount Lemmon Survey || — || align=right | 2.3 km || 
|-id=692 bgcolor=#d6d6d6
| 433692 ||  || — || October 14, 2009 || Mount Lemmon || Mount Lemmon Survey || — || align=right | 3.2 km || 
|-id=693 bgcolor=#fefefe
| 433693 ||  || — || February 27, 2008 || Kitt Peak || Spacewatch || NYS || align=right data-sort-value="0.71" | 710 m || 
|-id=694 bgcolor=#E9E9E9
| 433694 ||  || — || November 16, 2006 || Mount Lemmon || Mount Lemmon Survey || — || align=right | 2.7 km || 
|-id=695 bgcolor=#E9E9E9
| 433695 ||  || — || May 15, 2009 || Kitt Peak || Spacewatch || — || align=right | 1.2 km || 
|-id=696 bgcolor=#fefefe
| 433696 ||  || — || November 9, 2004 || Catalina || CSS || — || align=right data-sort-value="0.70" | 700 m || 
|-id=697 bgcolor=#d6d6d6
| 433697 ||  || — || April 12, 2004 || Socorro || LINEAR || Tj (2.98) || align=right | 3.3 km || 
|-id=698 bgcolor=#d6d6d6
| 433698 ||  || — || December 19, 2003 || Socorro || LINEAR || — || align=right | 3.7 km || 
|-id=699 bgcolor=#fefefe
| 433699 ||  || — || May 2, 2008 || Kitt Peak || Spacewatch || V || align=right data-sort-value="0.87" | 870 m || 
|-id=700 bgcolor=#d6d6d6
| 433700 ||  || — || March 13, 2010 || Catalina || CSS || — || align=right | 4.0 km || 
|}

433701–433800 

|-bgcolor=#E9E9E9
| 433701 ||  || — || September 23, 2008 || Kitt Peak || Spacewatch || — || align=right | 2.6 km || 
|-id=702 bgcolor=#d6d6d6
| 433702 ||  || — || February 11, 2004 || Kitt Peak || Spacewatch || — || align=right | 2.7 km || 
|-id=703 bgcolor=#d6d6d6
| 433703 ||  || — || November 9, 2008 || Mount Lemmon || Mount Lemmon Survey || — || align=right | 3.6 km || 
|-id=704 bgcolor=#E9E9E9
| 433704 ||  || — || February 3, 2001 || Kitt Peak || Spacewatch || — || align=right | 2.9 km || 
|-id=705 bgcolor=#d6d6d6
| 433705 ||  || — || March 9, 2010 || WISE || WISE || — || align=right | 3.5 km || 
|-id=706 bgcolor=#d6d6d6
| 433706 ||  || — || January 25, 2007 || Catalina || CSS || 3:2 || align=right | 3.9 km || 
|-id=707 bgcolor=#d6d6d6
| 433707 ||  || — || September 22, 2008 || Mount Lemmon || Mount Lemmon Survey || — || align=right | 2.9 km || 
|-id=708 bgcolor=#d6d6d6
| 433708 ||  || — || September 16, 2003 || Kitt Peak || Spacewatch || — || align=right | 3.2 km || 
|-id=709 bgcolor=#d6d6d6
| 433709 ||  || — || May 7, 2005 || Kitt Peak || Spacewatch || — || align=right | 3.4 km || 
|-id=710 bgcolor=#d6d6d6
| 433710 ||  || — || January 11, 2010 || Kitt Peak || Spacewatch || EOS || align=right | 2.9 km || 
|-id=711 bgcolor=#fefefe
| 433711 ||  || — || February 16, 2004 || Socorro || LINEAR || — || align=right | 1.0 km || 
|-id=712 bgcolor=#fefefe
| 433712 ||  || — || April 3, 2000 || Anderson Mesa || LONEOS || NYS || align=right data-sort-value="0.86" | 860 m || 
|-id=713 bgcolor=#fefefe
| 433713 ||  || — || September 28, 2006 || Catalina || CSS || — || align=right data-sort-value="0.94" | 940 m || 
|-id=714 bgcolor=#d6d6d6
| 433714 ||  || — || December 19, 2003 || Socorro || LINEAR || — || align=right | 2.2 km || 
|-id=715 bgcolor=#d6d6d6
| 433715 ||  || — || October 6, 2008 || Kitt Peak || Spacewatch || — || align=right | 1.9 km || 
|-id=716 bgcolor=#d6d6d6
| 433716 ||  || — || January 11, 1999 || Kitt Peak || Spacewatch || — || align=right | 3.1 km || 
|-id=717 bgcolor=#fefefe
| 433717 ||  || — || December 21, 2006 || Kitt Peak || Spacewatch || H || align=right data-sort-value="0.82" | 820 m || 
|-id=718 bgcolor=#d6d6d6
| 433718 ||  || — || October 30, 2008 || Catalina || CSS || — || align=right | 3.3 km || 
|-id=719 bgcolor=#d6d6d6
| 433719 ||  || — || December 19, 2003 || Kitt Peak || Spacewatch || EOS || align=right | 2.4 km || 
|-id=720 bgcolor=#E9E9E9
| 433720 ||  || — || February 23, 1998 || Kitt Peak || Spacewatch || — || align=right | 2.2 km || 
|-id=721 bgcolor=#d6d6d6
| 433721 ||  || — || April 27, 2011 || Mount Lemmon || Mount Lemmon Survey || — || align=right | 4.1 km || 
|-id=722 bgcolor=#E9E9E9
| 433722 ||  || — || December 1, 1996 || Kitt Peak || Spacewatch || — || align=right | 4.5 km || 
|-id=723 bgcolor=#E9E9E9
| 433723 ||  || — || December 14, 2001 || Socorro || LINEAR || — || align=right | 1.8 km || 
|-id=724 bgcolor=#d6d6d6
| 433724 ||  || — || November 2, 2007 || Mount Lemmon || Mount Lemmon Survey || — || align=right | 3.5 km || 
|-id=725 bgcolor=#fefefe
| 433725 ||  || — || January 11, 2008 || Kitt Peak || Spacewatch || — || align=right data-sort-value="0.90" | 900 m || 
|-id=726 bgcolor=#d6d6d6
| 433726 ||  || — || October 26, 2008 || Kitt Peak || Spacewatch || LIX || align=right | 3.7 km || 
|-id=727 bgcolor=#d6d6d6
| 433727 ||  || — || January 15, 2004 || Kitt Peak || Spacewatch || — || align=right | 3.1 km || 
|-id=728 bgcolor=#d6d6d6
| 433728 ||  || — || October 10, 2008 || Mount Lemmon || Mount Lemmon Survey || — || align=right | 3.1 km || 
|-id=729 bgcolor=#d6d6d6
| 433729 ||  || — || September 14, 2007 || Kitt Peak || Spacewatch || HYG || align=right | 3.1 km || 
|-id=730 bgcolor=#E9E9E9
| 433730 ||  || — || April 24, 2007 || Kitt Peak || Spacewatch || — || align=right | 3.1 km || 
|-id=731 bgcolor=#d6d6d6
| 433731 ||  || — || November 6, 2008 || Mount Lemmon || Mount Lemmon Survey || EOS || align=right | 2.0 km || 
|-id=732 bgcolor=#E9E9E9
| 433732 ||  || — || January 9, 2006 || Mount Lemmon || Mount Lemmon Survey || — || align=right | 1.8 km || 
|-id=733 bgcolor=#fefefe
| 433733 ||  || — || February 29, 2004 || Kitt Peak || Spacewatch || — || align=right | 1.4 km || 
|-id=734 bgcolor=#E9E9E9
| 433734 ||  || — || August 23, 2004 || Kitt Peak || Spacewatch || — || align=right | 1.9 km || 
|-id=735 bgcolor=#fefefe
| 433735 ||  || — || March 21, 2001 || Kitt Peak || Spacewatch || MAS || align=right data-sort-value="0.65" | 650 m || 
|-id=736 bgcolor=#fefefe
| 433736 ||  || — || February 10, 2002 || Socorro || LINEAR || — || align=right data-sort-value="0.75" | 750 m || 
|-id=737 bgcolor=#d6d6d6
| 433737 ||  || — || December 29, 2003 || Kitt Peak || Spacewatch || THM || align=right | 2.3 km || 
|-id=738 bgcolor=#d6d6d6
| 433738 ||  || — || January 27, 2004 || Kitt Peak || Spacewatch || — || align=right | 2.9 km || 
|-id=739 bgcolor=#E9E9E9
| 433739 ||  || — || January 25, 2006 || Kitt Peak || Spacewatch || — || align=right | 1.8 km || 
|-id=740 bgcolor=#fefefe
| 433740 ||  || — || February 10, 2008 || Mount Lemmon || Mount Lemmon Survey || MAS || align=right data-sort-value="0.84" | 840 m || 
|-id=741 bgcolor=#E9E9E9
| 433741 ||  || — || April 18, 2007 || Kitt Peak || Spacewatch || — || align=right | 1.4 km || 
|-id=742 bgcolor=#E9E9E9
| 433742 ||  || — || February 17, 2007 || Kitt Peak || Spacewatch || — || align=right data-sort-value="0.80" | 800 m || 
|-id=743 bgcolor=#E9E9E9
| 433743 ||  || — || February 13, 2011 || Mount Lemmon || Mount Lemmon Survey || — || align=right | 1.8 km || 
|-id=744 bgcolor=#E9E9E9
| 433744 ||  || — || January 19, 2001 || Socorro || LINEAR || — || align=right | 1.8 km || 
|-id=745 bgcolor=#d6d6d6
| 433745 ||  || — || February 16, 2004 || Socorro || LINEAR || — || align=right | 3.7 km || 
|-id=746 bgcolor=#E9E9E9
| 433746 ||  || — || December 12, 1996 || Kitt Peak || Spacewatch || — || align=right | 1.4 km || 
|-id=747 bgcolor=#E9E9E9
| 433747 ||  || — || January 26, 2006 || Mount Lemmon || Mount Lemmon Survey || — || align=right | 1.9 km || 
|-id=748 bgcolor=#fefefe
| 433748 ||  || — || July 28, 2003 || Campo Imperatore || CINEOS || — || align=right data-sort-value="0.78" | 780 m || 
|-id=749 bgcolor=#fefefe
| 433749 ||  || — || May 15, 2004 || Campo Imperatore || CINEOS || MAS || align=right data-sort-value="0.78" | 780 m || 
|-id=750 bgcolor=#E9E9E9
| 433750 ||  || — || September 24, 2005 || Kitt Peak || Spacewatch || — || align=right | 1.5 km || 
|-id=751 bgcolor=#E9E9E9
| 433751 ||  || — || January 25, 2006 || Kitt Peak || Spacewatch || — || align=right | 2.4 km || 
|-id=752 bgcolor=#E9E9E9
| 433752 ||  || — || November 11, 2004 || Kitt Peak || Spacewatch || — || align=right | 2.9 km || 
|-id=753 bgcolor=#E9E9E9
| 433753 ||  || — || April 2, 2006 || Kitt Peak || Spacewatch || — || align=right | 2.7 km || 
|-id=754 bgcolor=#E9E9E9
| 433754 ||  || — || October 24, 2009 || Kitt Peak || Spacewatch || — || align=right | 1.1 km || 
|-id=755 bgcolor=#E9E9E9
| 433755 ||  || — || December 2, 2004 || Kitt Peak || Spacewatch || AGN || align=right | 1.4 km || 
|-id=756 bgcolor=#fefefe
| 433756 ||  || — || February 25, 2000 || Kitt Peak || Spacewatch || — || align=right | 1.2 km || 
|-id=757 bgcolor=#d6d6d6
| 433757 ||  || — || October 16, 2007 || Mount Lemmon || Mount Lemmon Survey || — || align=right | 3.6 km || 
|-id=758 bgcolor=#d6d6d6
| 433758 ||  || — || November 7, 2008 || Mount Lemmon || Mount Lemmon Survey || — || align=right | 3.5 km || 
|-id=759 bgcolor=#d6d6d6
| 433759 ||  || — || August 10, 2007 || Kitt Peak || Spacewatch || — || align=right | 2.8 km || 
|-id=760 bgcolor=#d6d6d6
| 433760 ||  || — || May 4, 2005 || Kitt Peak || Spacewatch || — || align=right | 2.9 km || 
|-id=761 bgcolor=#E9E9E9
| 433761 ||  || — || February 8, 2007 || Kitt Peak || Spacewatch || — || align=right data-sort-value="0.86" | 860 m || 
|-id=762 bgcolor=#fefefe
| 433762 ||  || — || March 15, 2004 || Kitt Peak || Spacewatch || — || align=right | 1.1 km || 
|-id=763 bgcolor=#fefefe
| 433763 ||  || — || October 23, 2006 || Mount Lemmon || Mount Lemmon Survey || — || align=right data-sort-value="0.98" | 980 m || 
|-id=764 bgcolor=#d6d6d6
| 433764 ||  || — || November 19, 2003 || Kitt Peak || Spacewatch || — || align=right | 2.7 km || 
|-id=765 bgcolor=#fefefe
| 433765 ||  || — || September 27, 2006 || Kitt Peak || Spacewatch || — || align=right data-sort-value="0.73" | 730 m || 
|-id=766 bgcolor=#fefefe
| 433766 ||  || — || February 9, 2008 || Kitt Peak || Spacewatch || — || align=right data-sort-value="0.78" | 780 m || 
|-id=767 bgcolor=#E9E9E9
| 433767 ||  || — || March 20, 2007 || Catalina || CSS || — || align=right | 1.3 km || 
|-id=768 bgcolor=#d6d6d6
| 433768 ||  || — || October 7, 2008 || Mount Lemmon || Mount Lemmon Survey || — || align=right | 2.2 km || 
|-id=769 bgcolor=#E9E9E9
| 433769 ||  || — || December 29, 2005 || Kitt Peak || Spacewatch || — || align=right | 1.2 km || 
|-id=770 bgcolor=#fefefe
| 433770 ||  || — || February 11, 2004 || Kitt Peak || Spacewatch || — || align=right data-sort-value="0.79" | 790 m || 
|-id=771 bgcolor=#d6d6d6
| 433771 ||  || — || December 1, 2008 || Kitt Peak || Spacewatch || — || align=right | 2.5 km || 
|-id=772 bgcolor=#d6d6d6
| 433772 ||  || — || November 3, 2008 || Mount Lemmon || Mount Lemmon Survey || — || align=right | 3.1 km || 
|-id=773 bgcolor=#E9E9E9
| 433773 ||  || — || November 21, 2005 || Kitt Peak || Spacewatch || — || align=right | 3.1 km || 
|-id=774 bgcolor=#fefefe
| 433774 ||  || — || October 14, 1998 || Kitt Peak || Spacewatch || — || align=right data-sort-value="0.71" | 710 m || 
|-id=775 bgcolor=#E9E9E9
| 433775 ||  || — || December 30, 2005 || Mount Lemmon || Mount Lemmon Survey || — || align=right | 2.1 km || 
|-id=776 bgcolor=#d6d6d6
| 433776 ||  || — || June 25, 2010 || WISE || WISE || VER || align=right | 3.6 km || 
|-id=777 bgcolor=#d6d6d6
| 433777 ||  || — || January 30, 2004 || Kitt Peak || Spacewatch || HYG || align=right | 3.8 km || 
|-id=778 bgcolor=#fefefe
| 433778 ||  || — || March 17, 2001 || Kitt Peak || Spacewatch || — || align=right data-sort-value="0.64" | 640 m || 
|-id=779 bgcolor=#E9E9E9
| 433779 ||  || — || March 4, 2006 || Kitt Peak || Spacewatch || AGN || align=right | 1.1 km || 
|-id=780 bgcolor=#d6d6d6
| 433780 ||  || — || February 14, 2010 || Mount Lemmon || Mount Lemmon Survey || — || align=right | 3.9 km || 
|-id=781 bgcolor=#E9E9E9
| 433781 ||  || — || October 28, 2005 || Kitt Peak || Spacewatch || — || align=right | 1.1 km || 
|-id=782 bgcolor=#E9E9E9
| 433782 ||  || — || February 13, 2010 || WISE || WISE || EUN || align=right | 4.6 km || 
|-id=783 bgcolor=#d6d6d6
| 433783 ||  || — || December 1, 2003 || Kitt Peak || Spacewatch || — || align=right | 2.8 km || 
|-id=784 bgcolor=#E9E9E9
| 433784 ||  || — || February 21, 2007 || Kitt Peak || Spacewatch || (5) || align=right data-sort-value="0.66" | 660 m || 
|-id=785 bgcolor=#fefefe
| 433785 ||  || — || December 16, 2007 || Anderson Mesa || LONEOS || — || align=right | 1.3 km || 
|-id=786 bgcolor=#fefefe
| 433786 ||  || — || March 17, 2005 || Mount Lemmon || Mount Lemmon Survey || (2076) || align=right data-sort-value="0.59" | 590 m || 
|-id=787 bgcolor=#d6d6d6
| 433787 ||  || — || February 17, 2004 || Kitt Peak || Spacewatch || THM || align=right | 2.2 km || 
|-id=788 bgcolor=#d6d6d6
| 433788 ||  || — || January 18, 1998 || Kitt Peak || Spacewatch || — || align=right | 3.2 km || 
|-id=789 bgcolor=#d6d6d6
| 433789 ||  || — || January 26, 1998 || Kitt Peak || Spacewatch || VER || align=right | 2.9 km || 
|-id=790 bgcolor=#fefefe
| 433790 ||  || — || March 3, 2000 || Socorro || LINEAR || — || align=right data-sort-value="0.76" | 760 m || 
|-id=791 bgcolor=#E9E9E9
| 433791 ||  || — || October 15, 2004 || Mount Lemmon || Mount Lemmon Survey || AST || align=right | 1.8 km || 
|-id=792 bgcolor=#d6d6d6
| 433792 ||  || — || October 2, 2008 || Mount Lemmon || Mount Lemmon Survey || KOR || align=right | 1.5 km || 
|-id=793 bgcolor=#fefefe
| 433793 ||  || — || November 17, 2006 || Mount Lemmon || Mount Lemmon Survey || — || align=right data-sort-value="0.83" | 830 m || 
|-id=794 bgcolor=#d6d6d6
| 433794 ||  || — || March 3, 2005 || Catalina || CSS || — || align=right | 3.7 km || 
|-id=795 bgcolor=#E9E9E9
| 433795 ||  || — || December 13, 2004 || Kitt Peak || Spacewatch || AGN || align=right | 1.6 km || 
|-id=796 bgcolor=#fefefe
| 433796 ||  || — || December 3, 2007 || Kitt Peak || Spacewatch || — || align=right data-sort-value="0.68" | 680 m || 
|-id=797 bgcolor=#d6d6d6
| 433797 ||  || — || October 25, 2008 || Kitt Peak || Spacewatch || — || align=right | 2.4 km || 
|-id=798 bgcolor=#E9E9E9
| 433798 ||  || — || December 22, 2005 || Kitt Peak || Spacewatch || — || align=right | 1.4 km || 
|-id=799 bgcolor=#d6d6d6
| 433799 ||  || — || February 12, 2004 || Kitt Peak || Spacewatch || — || align=right | 2.5 km || 
|-id=800 bgcolor=#fefefe
| 433800 ||  || — || January 30, 2004 || Kitt Peak || Spacewatch || NYS || align=right data-sort-value="0.49" | 490 m || 
|}

433801–433900 

|-bgcolor=#fefefe
| 433801 ||  || — || January 15, 2005 || Kitt Peak || Spacewatch || — || align=right data-sort-value="0.69" | 690 m || 
|-id=802 bgcolor=#d6d6d6
| 433802 ||  || — || December 19, 2003 || Kitt Peak || Spacewatch || — || align=right | 2.9 km || 
|-id=803 bgcolor=#E9E9E9
| 433803 ||  || — || May 12, 2007 || Mount Lemmon || Mount Lemmon Survey || — || align=right | 2.8 km || 
|-id=804 bgcolor=#fefefe
| 433804 ||  || — || January 10, 2008 || Mount Lemmon || Mount Lemmon Survey || NYS || align=right data-sort-value="0.53" | 530 m || 
|-id=805 bgcolor=#d6d6d6
| 433805 ||  || — || December 20, 2004 || Mount Lemmon || Mount Lemmon Survey || — || align=right | 5.1 km || 
|-id=806 bgcolor=#d6d6d6
| 433806 ||  || — || May 6, 2005 || Catalina || CSS || — || align=right | 2.4 km || 
|-id=807 bgcolor=#fefefe
| 433807 ||  || — || February 8, 2008 || Kitt Peak || Spacewatch || — || align=right data-sort-value="0.89" | 890 m || 
|-id=808 bgcolor=#fefefe
| 433808 ||  || — || December 21, 2006 || Kitt Peak || Spacewatch || — || align=right | 1.1 km || 
|-id=809 bgcolor=#fefefe
| 433809 ||  || — || March 18, 2004 || Kitt Peak || Spacewatch || — || align=right data-sort-value="0.73" | 730 m || 
|-id=810 bgcolor=#d6d6d6
| 433810 ||  || — || February 16, 2004 || Kitt Peak || Spacewatch || EOS || align=right | 2.4 km || 
|-id=811 bgcolor=#E9E9E9
| 433811 ||  || — || October 26, 2009 || Mount Lemmon || Mount Lemmon Survey || — || align=right data-sort-value="0.70" | 700 m || 
|-id=812 bgcolor=#d6d6d6
| 433812 ||  || — || September 10, 2007 || Kitt Peak || Spacewatch || — || align=right | 3.5 km || 
|-id=813 bgcolor=#d6d6d6
| 433813 ||  || — || February 13, 2004 || Kitt Peak || Spacewatch || — || align=right | 4.2 km || 
|-id=814 bgcolor=#fefefe
| 433814 ||  || — || April 12, 2005 || Kitt Peak || Spacewatch || — || align=right data-sort-value="0.74" | 740 m || 
|-id=815 bgcolor=#fefefe
| 433815 ||  || — || October 31, 2000 || Socorro || LINEAR || — || align=right | 2.2 km || 
|-id=816 bgcolor=#d6d6d6
| 433816 ||  || — || September 2, 2007 || Mount Lemmon || Mount Lemmon Survey || — || align=right | 4.5 km || 
|-id=817 bgcolor=#E9E9E9
| 433817 ||  || — || November 24, 2009 || Kitt Peak || Spacewatch || — || align=right | 2.7 km || 
|-id=818 bgcolor=#E9E9E9
| 433818 ||  || — || September 15, 2004 || Kitt Peak || Spacewatch || — || align=right | 2.3 km || 
|-id=819 bgcolor=#d6d6d6
| 433819 ||  || — || August 24, 2008 || Kitt Peak || Spacewatch || — || align=right | 2.4 km || 
|-id=820 bgcolor=#d6d6d6
| 433820 ||  || — || January 2, 1998 || Kitt Peak || Spacewatch || — || align=right | 4.0 km || 
|-id=821 bgcolor=#fefefe
| 433821 ||  || — || December 12, 2006 || Kitt Peak || Spacewatch || — || align=right data-sort-value="0.86" | 860 m || 
|-id=822 bgcolor=#E9E9E9
| 433822 ||  || — || February 17, 2007 || Kitt Peak || Spacewatch || — || align=right | 1.0 km || 
|-id=823 bgcolor=#d6d6d6
| 433823 ||  || — || February 18, 2010 || Kitt Peak || Spacewatch || — || align=right | 2.6 km || 
|-id=824 bgcolor=#d6d6d6
| 433824 ||  || — || May 4, 2005 || Kitt Peak || Spacewatch || — || align=right | 2.3 km || 
|-id=825 bgcolor=#fefefe
| 433825 ||  || — || March 5, 2008 || Mount Lemmon || Mount Lemmon Survey || — || align=right data-sort-value="0.90" | 900 m || 
|-id=826 bgcolor=#fefefe
| 433826 ||  || — || March 16, 2004 || Campo Imperatore || CINEOS || — || align=right data-sort-value="0.90" | 900 m || 
|-id=827 bgcolor=#d6d6d6
| 433827 ||  || — || December 31, 2008 || Kitt Peak || Spacewatch || — || align=right | 2.7 km || 
|-id=828 bgcolor=#E9E9E9
| 433828 ||  || — || June 10, 2008 || Kitt Peak || Spacewatch || — || align=right data-sort-value="0.91" | 910 m || 
|-id=829 bgcolor=#E9E9E9
| 433829 ||  || — || December 1, 2005 || Mount Lemmon || Mount Lemmon Survey || — || align=right | 1.9 km || 
|-id=830 bgcolor=#E9E9E9
| 433830 ||  || — || November 29, 2000 || Kitt Peak || Spacewatch || PAD || align=right | 1.9 km || 
|-id=831 bgcolor=#E9E9E9
| 433831 ||  || — || October 11, 2004 || Kitt Peak || Spacewatch ||  || align=right | 1.9 km || 
|-id=832 bgcolor=#d6d6d6
| 433832 ||  || — || December 21, 2008 || Kitt Peak || Spacewatch || — || align=right | 3.1 km || 
|-id=833 bgcolor=#d6d6d6
| 433833 ||  || — || June 28, 1995 || Kitt Peak || Spacewatch || — || align=right | 4.1 km || 
|-id=834 bgcolor=#d6d6d6
| 433834 ||  || — || December 18, 2003 || Kitt Peak || Spacewatch || EOS || align=right | 2.3 km || 
|-id=835 bgcolor=#d6d6d6
| 433835 ||  || — || November 9, 2008 || Kitt Peak || Spacewatch || — || align=right | 2.1 km || 
|-id=836 bgcolor=#E9E9E9
| 433836 ||  || — || May 21, 2012 || Mount Lemmon || Mount Lemmon Survey || — || align=right | 2.0 km || 
|-id=837 bgcolor=#d6d6d6
| 433837 ||  || — || March 9, 2005 || Kitt Peak || Spacewatch || KOR || align=right | 1.6 km || 
|-id=838 bgcolor=#fefefe
| 433838 ||  || — || March 3, 2000 || Socorro || LINEAR || MAS || align=right data-sort-value="0.86" | 860 m || 
|-id=839 bgcolor=#d6d6d6
| 433839 ||  || — || February 27, 2000 || Kitt Peak || Spacewatch || — || align=right | 2.5 km || 
|-id=840 bgcolor=#fefefe
| 433840 ||  || — || February 14, 2004 || Kitt Peak || Spacewatch || MAS || align=right data-sort-value="0.64" | 640 m || 
|-id=841 bgcolor=#E9E9E9
| 433841 ||  || — || January 27, 2007 || Kitt Peak || Spacewatch || — || align=right | 1.1 km || 
|-id=842 bgcolor=#E9E9E9
| 433842 ||  || — || September 2, 2008 || Kitt Peak || Spacewatch || AGN || align=right | 1.3 km || 
|-id=843 bgcolor=#d6d6d6
| 433843 ||  || — || May 14, 2010 || WISE || WISE || — || align=right | 3.1 km || 
|-id=844 bgcolor=#d6d6d6
| 433844 ||  || — || September 24, 2008 || Kitt Peak || Spacewatch || KOR || align=right | 1.3 km || 
|-id=845 bgcolor=#d6d6d6
| 433845 ||  || — || January 15, 2004 || Kitt Peak || Spacewatch || — || align=right | 2.6 km || 
|-id=846 bgcolor=#E9E9E9
| 433846 ||  || — || April 11, 2003 || Kitt Peak || Spacewatch || — || align=right | 1.1 km || 
|-id=847 bgcolor=#E9E9E9
| 433847 ||  || — || January 27, 2007 || Mount Lemmon || Mount Lemmon Survey || — || align=right data-sort-value="0.84" | 840 m || 
|-id=848 bgcolor=#d6d6d6
| 433848 ||  || — || April 1, 2005 || Kitt Peak || Spacewatch || — || align=right | 3.0 km || 
|-id=849 bgcolor=#E9E9E9
| 433849 ||  || — || September 7, 2008 || Mount Lemmon || Mount Lemmon Survey || AST || align=right | 1.9 km || 
|-id=850 bgcolor=#E9E9E9
| 433850 ||  || — || January 27, 2006 || Kitt Peak || Spacewatch || ADE || align=right | 2.2 km || 
|-id=851 bgcolor=#d6d6d6
| 433851 ||  || — || November 23, 2003 || Kitt Peak || Spacewatch || — || align=right | 2.3 km || 
|-id=852 bgcolor=#d6d6d6
| 433852 ||  || — || June 2, 2010 || WISE || WISE || — || align=right | 3.6 km || 
|-id=853 bgcolor=#d6d6d6
| 433853 ||  || — || November 20, 2008 || Mount Lemmon || Mount Lemmon Survey || KOR || align=right | 1.4 km || 
|-id=854 bgcolor=#d6d6d6
| 433854 ||  || — || January 29, 2009 || Mount Lemmon || Mount Lemmon Survey || — || align=right | 4.1 km || 
|-id=855 bgcolor=#E9E9E9
| 433855 ||  || — || February 27, 2006 || Kitt Peak || Spacewatch || AGN || align=right | 1.5 km || 
|-id=856 bgcolor=#E9E9E9
| 433856 ||  || — || March 12, 2007 || Kitt Peak || Spacewatch || — || align=right data-sort-value="0.97" | 970 m || 
|-id=857 bgcolor=#d6d6d6
| 433857 ||  || — || February 11, 2004 || Anderson Mesa || LONEOS || — || align=right | 4.3 km || 
|-id=858 bgcolor=#fefefe
| 433858 ||  || — || March 23, 2004 || Kitt Peak || Spacewatch || — || align=right data-sort-value="0.71" | 710 m || 
|-id=859 bgcolor=#d6d6d6
| 433859 ||  || — || February 19, 2004 || Socorro || LINEAR || — || align=right | 3.1 km || 
|-id=860 bgcolor=#E9E9E9
| 433860 ||  || — || January 22, 2010 || WISE || WISE || — || align=right | 1.1 km || 
|-id=861 bgcolor=#d6d6d6
| 433861 ||  || — || March 15, 2010 || Mount Lemmon || Mount Lemmon Survey || THM || align=right | 2.0 km || 
|-id=862 bgcolor=#d6d6d6
| 433862 ||  || — || October 4, 2007 || Catalina || CSS || — || align=right | 3.3 km || 
|-id=863 bgcolor=#fefefe
| 433863 ||  || — || December 22, 1995 || Kitt Peak || Spacewatch || NYS || align=right data-sort-value="0.54" | 540 m || 
|-id=864 bgcolor=#E9E9E9
| 433864 ||  || — || September 9, 2008 || Mount Lemmon || Mount Lemmon Survey || — || align=right | 2.9 km || 
|-id=865 bgcolor=#E9E9E9
| 433865 ||  || — || December 12, 2004 || Kitt Peak || Spacewatch || — || align=right | 4.2 km || 
|-id=866 bgcolor=#fefefe
| 433866 ||  || — || March 29, 1997 || Xinglong || SCAP || — || align=right | 1.5 km || 
|-id=867 bgcolor=#E9E9E9
| 433867 ||  || — || May 23, 2007 || Mount Lemmon || Mount Lemmon Survey || — || align=right | 1.9 km || 
|-id=868 bgcolor=#E9E9E9
| 433868 ||  || — || February 28, 2006 || Catalina || CSS || — || align=right | 1.8 km || 
|-id=869 bgcolor=#d6d6d6
| 433869 ||  || — || February 13, 2004 || Kitt Peak || Spacewatch || — || align=right | 3.8 km || 
|-id=870 bgcolor=#E9E9E9
| 433870 ||  || — || August 9, 2013 || Kitt Peak || Spacewatch || EUN || align=right | 1.1 km || 
|-id=871 bgcolor=#fefefe
| 433871 ||  || — || October 21, 2006 || Mount Lemmon || Mount Lemmon Survey || NYS || align=right data-sort-value="0.65" | 650 m || 
|-id=872 bgcolor=#fefefe
| 433872 ||  || — || December 9, 2004 || Kitt Peak || Spacewatch || — || align=right data-sort-value="0.80" | 800 m || 
|-id=873 bgcolor=#C7FF8F
| 433873 ||  || — || June 3, 2006 || Mount Lemmon || Mount Lemmon Survey || centaur || align=right | 16 km || 
|-id=874 bgcolor=#d6d6d6
| 433874 ||  || — || May 1, 2006 || Kitt Peak || Spacewatch || — || align=right | 2.3 km || 
|-id=875 bgcolor=#E9E9E9
| 433875 ||  || — || April 22, 2007 || Mount Lemmon || Mount Lemmon Survey || — || align=right | 2.2 km || 
|-id=876 bgcolor=#fefefe
| 433876 ||  || — || November 15, 2006 || Kitt Peak || Spacewatch || V || align=right data-sort-value="0.73" | 730 m || 
|-id=877 bgcolor=#d6d6d6
| 433877 ||  || — || September 10, 2007 || Kitt Peak || Spacewatch || — || align=right | 3.1 km || 
|-id=878 bgcolor=#E9E9E9
| 433878 ||  || — || October 7, 2004 || Kitt Peak || Spacewatch || — || align=right | 1.7 km || 
|-id=879 bgcolor=#E9E9E9
| 433879 ||  || — || March 3, 2006 || Mount Lemmon || Mount Lemmon Survey || — || align=right | 2.2 km || 
|-id=880 bgcolor=#E9E9E9
| 433880 ||  || — || December 18, 2004 || Mount Lemmon || Mount Lemmon Survey || — || align=right | 3.0 km || 
|-id=881 bgcolor=#fefefe
| 433881 ||  || — || October 31, 2010 || Kitt Peak || Spacewatch || — || align=right data-sort-value="0.64" | 640 m || 
|-id=882 bgcolor=#E9E9E9
| 433882 ||  || — || October 15, 2004 || Mount Lemmon || Mount Lemmon Survey || — || align=right | 2.5 km || 
|-id=883 bgcolor=#d6d6d6
| 433883 ||  || — || January 31, 1995 || Kitt Peak || Spacewatch || — || align=right | 2.2 km || 
|-id=884 bgcolor=#d6d6d6
| 433884 ||  || — || February 9, 2010 || Kitt Peak || Spacewatch || — || align=right | 3.3 km || 
|-id=885 bgcolor=#E9E9E9
| 433885 ||  || — || November 3, 2005 || Mount Lemmon || Mount Lemmon Survey || — || align=right data-sort-value="0.98" | 980 m || 
|-id=886 bgcolor=#fefefe
| 433886 ||  || — || October 17, 2006 || Mount Lemmon || Mount Lemmon Survey || MAS || align=right data-sort-value="0.65" | 650 m || 
|-id=887 bgcolor=#E9E9E9
| 433887 ||  || — || December 6, 2005 || Kitt Peak || Spacewatch || — || align=right | 2.8 km || 
|-id=888 bgcolor=#d6d6d6
| 433888 ||  || — || June 4, 2005 || Kitt Peak || Spacewatch || — || align=right | 3.1 km || 
|-id=889 bgcolor=#fefefe
| 433889 ||  || — || December 11, 2004 || Kitt Peak || Spacewatch || — || align=right data-sort-value="0.59" | 590 m || 
|-id=890 bgcolor=#E9E9E9
| 433890 ||  || — || December 24, 2005 || Kitt Peak || Spacewatch || — || align=right | 1.4 km || 
|-id=891 bgcolor=#d6d6d6
| 433891 ||  || — || March 8, 2005 || Kitt Peak || Spacewatch || EOS || align=right | 1.7 km || 
|-id=892 bgcolor=#E9E9E9
| 433892 ||  || — || January 22, 2006 || Mount Lemmon || Mount Lemmon Survey || — || align=right | 2.1 km || 
|-id=893 bgcolor=#E9E9E9
| 433893 ||  || — || September 2, 2008 || Kitt Peak || Spacewatch || — || align=right | 2.3 km || 
|-id=894 bgcolor=#d6d6d6
| 433894 ||  || — || March 9, 2005 || Mount Lemmon || Mount Lemmon Survey || — || align=right | 2.1 km || 
|-id=895 bgcolor=#fefefe
| 433895 ||  || — || April 5, 2000 || Kitt Peak || Spacewatch || NYS || align=right data-sort-value="0.72" | 720 m || 
|-id=896 bgcolor=#E9E9E9
| 433896 ||  || — || March 13, 2007 || Kitt Peak || Spacewatch || — || align=right | 1.6 km || 
|-id=897 bgcolor=#d6d6d6
| 433897 ||  || — || March 17, 2005 || Kitt Peak || Spacewatch || — || align=right | 2.6 km || 
|-id=898 bgcolor=#E9E9E9
| 433898 ||  || — || December 14, 2004 || Kitt Peak || Spacewatch || AGN || align=right | 1.5 km || 
|-id=899 bgcolor=#d6d6d6
| 433899 ||  || — || March 9, 2005 || Mount Lemmon || Mount Lemmon Survey || — || align=right | 2.1 km || 
|-id=900 bgcolor=#d6d6d6
| 433900 ||  || — || February 11, 2004 || Kitt Peak || Spacewatch || THM || align=right | 2.3 km || 
|}

433901–434000 

|-bgcolor=#E9E9E9
| 433901 ||  || — || March 12, 2007 || Kitt Peak || Spacewatch || — || align=right data-sort-value="0.98" | 980 m || 
|-id=902 bgcolor=#E9E9E9
| 433902 ||  || — || November 4, 2004 || Socorro || LINEAR || — || align=right | 2.8 km || 
|-id=903 bgcolor=#d6d6d6
| 433903 ||  || — || December 5, 2008 || Mount Lemmon || Mount Lemmon Survey || — || align=right | 3.5 km || 
|-id=904 bgcolor=#d6d6d6
| 433904 ||  || — || October 1, 2003 || Kitt Peak || Spacewatch || — || align=right | 2.1 km || 
|-id=905 bgcolor=#E9E9E9
| 433905 ||  || — || January 27, 2006 || Kitt Peak || Spacewatch || — || align=right | 2.3 km || 
|-id=906 bgcolor=#E9E9E9
| 433906 ||  || — || December 18, 2009 || Mount Lemmon || Mount Lemmon Survey ||  || align=right | 2.3 km || 
|-id=907 bgcolor=#E9E9E9
| 433907 ||  || — || April 24, 2007 || Kitt Peak || Spacewatch || — || align=right | 2.7 km || 
|-id=908 bgcolor=#fefefe
| 433908 ||  || — || August 9, 2013 || Catalina || CSS || H || align=right data-sort-value="0.69" | 690 m || 
|-id=909 bgcolor=#d6d6d6
| 433909 ||  || — || October 11, 2007 || Kitt Peak || Spacewatch || — || align=right | 3.1 km || 
|-id=910 bgcolor=#d6d6d6
| 433910 ||  || — || February 2, 2005 || Kitt Peak || Spacewatch || — || align=right | 2.3 km || 
|-id=911 bgcolor=#E9E9E9
| 433911 ||  || — || October 18, 2009 || Mount Lemmon || Mount Lemmon Survey || MIS || align=right | 2.2 km || 
|-id=912 bgcolor=#fefefe
| 433912 ||  || — || January 16, 2005 || Kitt Peak || Spacewatch || — || align=right data-sort-value="0.81" | 810 m || 
|-id=913 bgcolor=#E9E9E9
| 433913 ||  || — || July 22, 1995 || Kitt Peak || Spacewatch || — || align=right | 1.5 km || 
|-id=914 bgcolor=#E9E9E9
| 433914 ||  || — || November 22, 2005 || Kitt Peak || Spacewatch || — || align=right data-sort-value="0.88" | 880 m || 
|-id=915 bgcolor=#d6d6d6
| 433915 ||  || — || February 12, 2004 || Kitt Peak || Spacewatch || — || align=right | 2.8 km || 
|-id=916 bgcolor=#fefefe
| 433916 ||  || — || February 2, 2005 || Kitt Peak || Spacewatch || — || align=right data-sort-value="0.71" | 710 m || 
|-id=917 bgcolor=#d6d6d6
| 433917 ||  || — || September 12, 2007 || Mount Lemmon || Mount Lemmon Survey || — || align=right | 2.5 km || 
|-id=918 bgcolor=#fefefe
| 433918 ||  || — || April 26, 1993 || Kitt Peak || Spacewatch || — || align=right data-sort-value="0.63" | 630 m || 
|-id=919 bgcolor=#d6d6d6
| 433919 ||  || — || June 17, 2006 || Kitt Peak || Spacewatch || EOS || align=right | 2.6 km || 
|-id=920 bgcolor=#d6d6d6
| 433920 ||  || — || October 2, 2008 || Mount Lemmon || Mount Lemmon Survey || KOR || align=right | 1.8 km || 
|-id=921 bgcolor=#d6d6d6
| 433921 ||  || — || July 6, 1997 || Kitt Peak || Spacewatch || KOR || align=right | 1.6 km || 
|-id=922 bgcolor=#fefefe
| 433922 ||  || — || October 1, 2003 || Kitt Peak || Spacewatch || — || align=right data-sort-value="0.74" | 740 m || 
|-id=923 bgcolor=#E9E9E9
| 433923 ||  || — || February 20, 2006 || Catalina || CSS || — || align=right | 2.1 km || 
|-id=924 bgcolor=#E9E9E9
| 433924 ||  || — || December 24, 2005 || Kitt Peak || Spacewatch || — || align=right | 1.6 km || 
|-id=925 bgcolor=#fefefe
| 433925 ||  || — || September 2, 2013 || Mount Lemmon || Mount Lemmon Survey || NYS || align=right data-sort-value="0.70" | 700 m || 
|-id=926 bgcolor=#E9E9E9
| 433926 ||  || — || February 20, 2006 || Mount Lemmon || Mount Lemmon Survey || — || align=right | 2.6 km || 
|-id=927 bgcolor=#d6d6d6
| 433927 ||  || — || February 17, 2004 || Kitt Peak || Spacewatch || — || align=right | 2.8 km || 
|-id=928 bgcolor=#fefefe
| 433928 ||  || — || February 29, 2004 || Kitt Peak || Spacewatch || — || align=right data-sort-value="0.86" | 860 m || 
|-id=929 bgcolor=#E9E9E9
| 433929 ||  || — || September 26, 2008 || Kitt Peak || Spacewatch || — || align=right | 1.9 km || 
|-id=930 bgcolor=#fefefe
| 433930 ||  || — || March 15, 2004 || Kitt Peak || Spacewatch || — || align=right data-sort-value="0.90" | 900 m || 
|-id=931 bgcolor=#d6d6d6
| 433931 ||  || — || October 5, 2002 || Kitt Peak || Spacewatch || — || align=right | 3.0 km || 
|-id=932 bgcolor=#d6d6d6
| 433932 ||  || — || August 24, 2001 || Kitt Peak || Spacewatch || — || align=right | 3.8 km || 
|-id=933 bgcolor=#d6d6d6
| 433933 ||  || — || May 4, 2005 || Catalina || CSS || — || align=right | 3.1 km || 
|-id=934 bgcolor=#E9E9E9
| 433934 ||  || — || February 14, 2002 || Kitt Peak || Spacewatch || — || align=right | 1.5 km || 
|-id=935 bgcolor=#E9E9E9
| 433935 ||  || — || March 10, 2002 || Kitt Peak || Spacewatch || — || align=right | 1.7 km || 
|-id=936 bgcolor=#d6d6d6
| 433936 ||  || — || February 16, 2004 || Kitt Peak || Spacewatch || THM || align=right | 1.9 km || 
|-id=937 bgcolor=#d6d6d6
| 433937 || 4216 P-L || — || September 24, 1960 || Palomar || PLS || — || align=right | 3.2 km || 
|-id=938 bgcolor=#fefefe
| 433938 ||  || — || October 29, 1994 || Kitt Peak || Spacewatch || H || align=right data-sort-value="0.73" | 730 m || 
|-id=939 bgcolor=#FFC2E0
| 433939 ||  || — || February 25, 1995 || Kitt Peak || Spacewatch || APOcritical || align=right data-sort-value="0.20" | 200 m || 
|-id=940 bgcolor=#FA8072
| 433940 ||  || — || August 18, 1995 || Siding Spring || R. H. McNaught || — || align=right | 1.0 km || 
|-id=941 bgcolor=#d6d6d6
| 433941 ||  || — || September 17, 1995 || Kitt Peak || Spacewatch || — || align=right | 2.2 km || 
|-id=942 bgcolor=#E9E9E9
| 433942 ||  || — || September 18, 1995 || Kitt Peak || Spacewatch || — || align=right | 1.2 km || 
|-id=943 bgcolor=#E9E9E9
| 433943 ||  || — || September 25, 1995 || Kitt Peak || Spacewatch || — || align=right | 1.0 km || 
|-id=944 bgcolor=#fefefe
| 433944 ||  || — || September 29, 1995 || Kitt Peak || Spacewatch || V || align=right data-sort-value="0.56" | 560 m || 
|-id=945 bgcolor=#E9E9E9
| 433945 ||  || — || September 20, 1995 || Kitt Peak || Spacewatch || — || align=right | 1.2 km || 
|-id=946 bgcolor=#E9E9E9
| 433946 ||  || — || October 16, 1995 || Kitt Peak || Spacewatch || — || align=right | 1.6 km || 
|-id=947 bgcolor=#d6d6d6
| 433947 ||  || — || October 17, 1995 || Kitt Peak || Spacewatch || — || align=right | 2.2 km || 
|-id=948 bgcolor=#fefefe
| 433948 ||  || — || January 12, 1996 || Kitt Peak || Spacewatch || — || align=right data-sort-value="0.79" | 790 m || 
|-id=949 bgcolor=#FA8072
| 433949 ||  || — || June 17, 1996 || Kitt Peak || Spacewatch || H || align=right data-sort-value="0.67" | 670 m || 
|-id=950 bgcolor=#E9E9E9
| 433950 ||  || — || April 29, 1997 || Kitt Peak || Spacewatch || — || align=right | 1.9 km || 
|-id=951 bgcolor=#E9E9E9
| 433951 ||  || — || April 30, 1997 || Socorro || LINEAR || — || align=right | 3.2 km || 
|-id=952 bgcolor=#d6d6d6
| 433952 ||  || — || November 23, 1997 || Kitt Peak || Spacewatch || — || align=right | 2.5 km || 
|-id=953 bgcolor=#FFC2E0
| 433953 ||  || — || December 4, 1997 || Socorro || LINEAR || APOPHA || align=right data-sort-value="0.26" | 260 m || 
|-id=954 bgcolor=#E9E9E9
| 433954 ||  || — || April 20, 1998 || Socorro || LINEAR || — || align=right | 3.3 km || 
|-id=955 bgcolor=#fefefe
| 433955 ||  || — || September 13, 1998 || Kitt Peak || Spacewatch || — || align=right data-sort-value="0.76" | 760 m || 
|-id=956 bgcolor=#E9E9E9
| 433956 ||  || — || September 26, 1998 || Socorro || LINEAR || — || align=right | 2.4 km || 
|-id=957 bgcolor=#fefefe
| 433957 ||  || — || November 10, 1998 || Socorro || LINEAR || — || align=right | 1.1 km || 
|-id=958 bgcolor=#d6d6d6
| 433958 ||  || — || November 14, 1998 || Kitt Peak || Spacewatch || — || align=right | 3.2 km || 
|-id=959 bgcolor=#FA8072
| 433959 ||  || — || March 22, 1999 || Socorro || LINEAR || — || align=right | 2.2 km || 
|-id=960 bgcolor=#FFC2E0
| 433960 ||  || — || May 12, 1999 || Socorro || LINEAR || AMO || align=right data-sort-value="0.41" | 410 m || 
|-id=961 bgcolor=#FA8072
| 433961 ||  || — || September 13, 1999 || Socorro || LINEAR || unusual || align=right | 2.2 km || 
|-id=962 bgcolor=#d6d6d6
| 433962 ||  || — || September 8, 1999 || Socorro || LINEAR || — || align=right | 4.2 km || 
|-id=963 bgcolor=#E9E9E9
| 433963 ||  || — || September 8, 1999 || Socorro || LINEAR || — || align=right | 1.2 km || 
|-id=964 bgcolor=#E9E9E9
| 433964 ||  || — || September 14, 1999 || Socorro || LINEAR || — || align=right | 1.9 km || 
|-id=965 bgcolor=#FA8072
| 433965 ||  || — || June 15, 1999 || Socorro || LINEAR || unusual || align=right | 2.1 km || 
|-id=966 bgcolor=#E9E9E9
| 433966 ||  || — || October 4, 1999 || Socorro || LINEAR || — || align=right | 1.5 km || 
|-id=967 bgcolor=#E9E9E9
| 433967 ||  || — || October 4, 1999 || Kitt Peak || Spacewatch || — || align=right | 2.0 km || 
|-id=968 bgcolor=#E9E9E9
| 433968 ||  || — || October 6, 1999 || Kitt Peak || Spacewatch || — || align=right data-sort-value="0.92" | 920 m || 
|-id=969 bgcolor=#d6d6d6
| 433969 ||  || — || October 10, 1999 || Kitt Peak || Spacewatch || — || align=right | 4.2 km || 
|-id=970 bgcolor=#fefefe
| 433970 ||  || — || October 4, 1999 || Socorro || LINEAR || — || align=right | 1.00 km || 
|-id=971 bgcolor=#fefefe
| 433971 ||  || — || October 6, 1999 || Socorro || LINEAR || — || align=right data-sort-value="0.90" | 900 m || 
|-id=972 bgcolor=#E9E9E9
| 433972 ||  || — || October 7, 1999 || Socorro || LINEAR || — || align=right | 1.8 km || 
|-id=973 bgcolor=#E9E9E9
| 433973 ||  || — || October 15, 1999 || Socorro || LINEAR || — || align=right | 2.4 km || 
|-id=974 bgcolor=#E9E9E9
| 433974 ||  || — || October 13, 1999 || Socorro || LINEAR || — || align=right | 1.3 km || 
|-id=975 bgcolor=#E9E9E9
| 433975 ||  || — || October 12, 1999 || Kitt Peak || Spacewatch || — || align=right | 2.1 km || 
|-id=976 bgcolor=#E9E9E9
| 433976 ||  || — || October 29, 1999 || Catalina || CSS || — || align=right | 1.9 km || 
|-id=977 bgcolor=#E9E9E9
| 433977 ||  || — || October 3, 1999 || Catalina || CSS || — || align=right | 2.0 km || 
|-id=978 bgcolor=#E9E9E9
| 433978 ||  || — || October 9, 1999 || Socorro || LINEAR || EUN || align=right | 1.5 km || 
|-id=979 bgcolor=#E9E9E9
| 433979 ||  || — || November 4, 1999 || Socorro || LINEAR || — || align=right | 1.7 km || 
|-id=980 bgcolor=#E9E9E9
| 433980 ||  || — || November 4, 1999 || Socorro || LINEAR || — || align=right | 1.6 km || 
|-id=981 bgcolor=#E9E9E9
| 433981 ||  || — || November 10, 1999 || Kitt Peak || Spacewatch || WIT || align=right data-sort-value="0.97" | 970 m || 
|-id=982 bgcolor=#E9E9E9
| 433982 ||  || — || November 9, 1999 || Socorro || LINEAR || — || align=right | 1.8 km || 
|-id=983 bgcolor=#E9E9E9
| 433983 ||  || — || November 14, 1999 || Socorro || LINEAR || (5) || align=right | 1.1 km || 
|-id=984 bgcolor=#E9E9E9
| 433984 ||  || — || November 12, 1999 || Socorro || LINEAR || — || align=right | 2.5 km || 
|-id=985 bgcolor=#E9E9E9
| 433985 ||  || — || December 2, 1999 || Kitt Peak || Spacewatch || — || align=right | 1.5 km || 
|-id=986 bgcolor=#FA8072
| 433986 ||  || — || October 8, 1999 || Socorro || LINEAR || — || align=right data-sort-value="0.54" | 540 m || 
|-id=987 bgcolor=#E9E9E9
| 433987 ||  || — || December 12, 1999 || Kitt Peak || Spacewatch || — || align=right | 1.9 km || 
|-id=988 bgcolor=#fefefe
| 433988 ||  || — || December 9, 1999 || Kitt Peak || Spacewatch || — || align=right data-sort-value="0.60" | 600 m || 
|-id=989 bgcolor=#C2FFFF
| 433989 ||  || — || January 6, 2000 || Kitt Peak || Spacewatch || L4 || align=right | 8.8 km || 
|-id=990 bgcolor=#fefefe
| 433990 ||  || — || February 11, 2000 || Kitt Peak || Spacewatch || — || align=right data-sort-value="0.84" | 840 m || 
|-id=991 bgcolor=#fefefe
| 433991 ||  || — || March 27, 2000 || Anderson Mesa || LONEOS || — || align=right | 1.1 km || 
|-id=992 bgcolor=#FFC2E0
| 433992 ||  || — || April 30, 2000 || Anderson Mesa || LONEOS || AMO +1km || align=right data-sort-value="0.83" | 830 m || 
|-id=993 bgcolor=#E9E9E9
| 433993 ||  || — || June 8, 2000 || Socorro || LINEAR || — || align=right | 2.0 km || 
|-id=994 bgcolor=#d6d6d6
| 433994 ||  || — || August 26, 2000 || Socorro || LINEAR || — || align=right | 3.5 km || 
|-id=995 bgcolor=#d6d6d6
| 433995 ||  || — || September 4, 2000 || Anderson Mesa || LONEOS || — || align=right | 2.9 km || 
|-id=996 bgcolor=#E9E9E9
| 433996 ||  || — || September 23, 2000 || Socorro || LINEAR || — || align=right | 2.2 km || 
|-id=997 bgcolor=#FA8072
| 433997 ||  || — || September 23, 2000 || Socorro || LINEAR || — || align=right data-sort-value="0.59" | 590 m || 
|-id=998 bgcolor=#d6d6d6
| 433998 ||  || — || September 23, 2000 || Socorro || LINEAR || — || align=right | 3.4 km || 
|-id=999 bgcolor=#E9E9E9
| 433999 ||  || — || September 24, 2000 || Socorro || LINEAR || — || align=right | 1.5 km || 
|-id=000 bgcolor=#E9E9E9
| 434000 ||  || — || September 27, 2000 || Socorro || LINEAR || — || align=right | 1.1 km || 
|}

References

External links 
 Discovery Circumstances: Numbered Minor Planets (430001)–(435000) (IAU Minor Planet Center)

0433